= Migmella scotia =

Scientific classification
- Kingdom: Animalia
- Phylum: Arthropoda
- Class: Insecta
- Order: Diptera
- Family: Tephritidae
- Subfamily: Tephritinae
- Tribe: Tephritini
- Genus: Migmella
- Species: M. scotia

Binomial name
- Migmella scotia Munro, 1957

Species of fly

Migmella scotia is a species of tephritid or fruit flies in the genus Migmella of the family Tephritidae.

== Distribution ==
- Kenya
