= Lethyna gladiatrix =

Scientific classification
- Kingdom: Animalia
- Phylum: Arthropoda
- Class: Insecta
- Order: Diptera
- Family: Tephritidae
- Subfamily: Tephritinae
- Tribe: Tephritini
- Genus: Lethyna
- Species: L. gladiatrix

Binomial name
- Lethyna gladiatrix (Bezzi, 1920)

Synonyms
- Ensina gladiatrix Bezzi, 1920

Species of fly

Lethyna gladiatrix is a species of tephritid or fruit flies in the genus Lethyna of the family Tephritidae.

== Distribution ==
Uganda, Zimbabwe, Namibia, South Africa, Lesotho.
