= Hyalotephritis complanata =

Scientific classification
- Kingdom: Animalia
- Phylum: Arthropoda
- Class: Insecta
- Order: Diptera
- Family: Tephritidae
- Subfamily: Tephritinae
- Tribe: Tephritini
- Genus: Hyalotephritis
- Species: H. complanata

Binomial name
- Hyalotephritis complanata (Munro, 1929)

Synonyms
- Terellia complanata Munro, 1929

Species of fly

Hyalotephritis complanata is a species of tephritid or fruit flies in the genus Hyalotephritis of the family Tephritidae.

== Distribution ==
Namibia, South Africa.
