= Tanaica pollinosa =

Scientific classification
- Kingdom: Animalia
- Phylum: Arthropoda
- Class: Insecta
- Order: Diptera
- Family: Tephritidae
- Subfamily: Tephritinae
- Tribe: Tephritini
- Genus: Tanaica
- Species: T. pollinosa

Binomial name
- Tanaica pollinosa Merz & Dawah, 2005

Species of fly

Tanaica pollinosa is a species of tephritid or fruit flies in the genus Tanaica of the family Tephritidae.

== Distribution ==
South Africa, Saudi Arabia.
