= Cryptophorellia vumbaensis =

Scientific classification
- Kingdom: Animalia
- Phylum: Arthropoda
- Class: Insecta
- Order: Diptera
- Family: Tephritidae
- Subfamily: Tephritinae
- Tribe: Tephritini
- Genus: Cryptophorellia
- Species: C. vumbaensis

Binomial name
- Cryptophorellia vumbaensis Freidberg & Hancock, 1989

Species of fly

Cryptophorellia vumbaensis is a species of tephritid or fruit flies in the genus Cryptophorellia of the family Tephritidae.

== Distribution ==
Zimbabwe, Malawi.
