= Pherothrinax lamborni =

Scientific classification
- Kingdom: Animalia
- Phylum: Arthropoda
- Class: Insecta
- Order: Diptera
- Family: Tephritidae
- Subfamily: Tephritinae
- Tribe: Tephritini
- Genus: Pherothrinax
- Species: P. lamborni

Binomial name
- Pherothrinax lamborni (Munro, 1935)

Synonyms
- Trypanea lamborni Munro, 1935

Species of fly

Pherothrinax lamborni is a species of tephritid or fruit flies in the genus Pherothrinax of the family Tephritidae.

== Distribution ==
Malawi.
