= Phaeogramma hispida =

Scientific classification
- Kingdom: Animalia
- Phylum: Arthropoda
- Class: Insecta
- Order: Diptera
- Family: Tephritidae
- Subfamily: Tephritinae
- Tribe: Tephritini
- Genus: Phaeogramma
- Species: P. hispida

Binomial name
- Phaeogramma hispida Hardy, 1980

Species of fly

Phaeogramma hispida is a species of tephritid or fruit flies in the genus Phaeogramma of the family Tephritidae.

== Distribution ==
Hawaiian Islands.
