= Cryptophorellia peringueyi =

Scientific classification
- Kingdom: Animalia
- Phylum: Arthropoda
- Class: Insecta
- Order: Diptera
- Family: Tephritidae
- Subfamily: Tephritinae
- Tribe: Tephritini
- Genus: Cryptophorellia
- Species: C. peringueyi

Binomial name
- Cryptophorellia peringueyi (Bezzi, 1924)

Synonyms
- Phorellia peringueyi Bezzi, 1924; Trypeta doris Munro, 1939

Species of fly

Cryptophorellia peringueyi is a species of tephritid or fruit flies in the genus Cryptophorellia of the family Tephritidae.

== Distribution ==
Uganda, Kenya, Zimbabwe, South Africa.
