= Capitites goliath =

Scientific classification
- Kingdom: Animalia
- Phylum: Arthropoda
- Class: Insecta
- Order: Diptera
- Family: Tephritidae
- Subfamily: Tephritinae
- Tribe: Tephritini
- Genus: Capitites
- Species: C. goliath

Binomial name
- Capitites goliath (Bezzi, 1924)

Synonyms
- Trypanea goliath Bezzi, 1924; Trypanea haemorrhoa Bezzi, 1926

Species of fly

Capitites goliath is a species of tephritid or fruit flies in the genus Capitites of the family Tephritidae.

== Distribution ==
South Africa.
