= Trupanodesis aurea =

Scientific classification
- Kingdom: Animalia
- Phylum: Arthropoda
- Class: Insecta
- Order: Diptera
- Family: Tephritidae
- Subfamily: Tephritinae
- Tribe: Tephritini
- Genus: Trupanodesis
- Species: T. aurea

Binomial name
- Trupanodesis aurea (Bezzi, 1924)

Synonyms
- Trypanea aurea Bezzi, 1924

Species of fly

Trupanodesis aurea is a species of tephritid or fruit flies in the genus Trupanodesis of the family Tephritidae.

== Distribution ==
Ethiopia, Tanzania, Malawi, Zimbabwe.
