= Oedosphenella canariensis =

Scientific classification
- Kingdom: Animalia
- Phylum: Arthropoda
- Class: Insecta
- Order: Diptera
- Family: Tephritidae
- Subfamily: Tephritinae
- Tribe: Tephritini
- Genus: Oedosphenella
- Species: O. canariensis

Binomial name
- Oedosphenella canariensis (Macquart, 1839)

Synonyms
- Tephritis canariensis Macquart, 1839

Species of fly

Oedosphenella canariensis is a species of tephritid or fruit flies in the genus Oedosphenella of the family Tephritidae.

== Distribution ==
Canary Islands.
