= Capitites kloofensis =

Scientific classification
- Kingdom: Animalia
- Phylum: Arthropoda
- Class: Insecta
- Order: Diptera
- Family: Tephritidae
- Subfamily: Tephritinae
- Tribe: Tephritini
- Genus: Capitites
- Species: C. kloofensis

Binomial name
- Capitites kloofensis (Munro, 1935)

Synonyms
- Trypanea goliath var. kloofensisMunro, 1935

Species of fly

Capitites kloofensis is a species of tephritid or fruit flies in the genus Capitites of the family Tephritidae.

== Distribution ==
South Africa.
