= Bevismyia basuto =

Scientific classification
- Kingdom: Animalia
- Phylum: Arthropoda
- Class: Insecta
- Order: Diptera
- Family: Tephritidae
- Subfamily: Tephritinae
- Tribe: Tephritini
- Genus: Bevismyia
- Species: B. basuto

Binomial name
- Bevismyia basuto Munro, 1957

Species of fly

Bevismyia basuto is a species of tephritid or fruit flies in the genus Bevismyia of the family Tephritidae.

== Distribution ==
Lesotho.
