= Homoeotricha procusa =

Scientific classification
- Kingdom: Animalia
- Phylum: Arthropoda
- Class: Insecta
- Order: Diptera
- Family: Tephritidae
- Subfamily: Tephritinae
- Tribe: Tephritini
- Genus: Homoeotricha
- Species: H. procusa

Binomial name
- Homoeotricha procusa (Dirlbek & Dirlbeková, 1971)

Synonyms
- Paroxyna procusa Dirlbek & Dirlbeková, 1971

Species of fly

Homoeotricha procusa is a species of tephritid or fruit flies in the genus Homoeotricha of the family Tephritidae.

== Distribution ==
Mongolia, China.
