= Pherothrinax subcompleta =

Scientific classification
- Kingdom: Animalia
- Phylum: Arthropoda
- Class: Insecta
- Order: Diptera
- Family: Tephritidae
- Subfamily: Tephritinae
- Tribe: Tephritini
- Genus: Pherothrinax
- Species: P. subcompleta

Binomial name
- Pherothrinax subcompleta (Bezzi, 1920)

Synonyms
- Trypanea subcompleta Bezzi, 1920

Species of fly

Pherothrinax subcompleta is a species of tephritid or fruit flies in the genus Pherothrinax of the family Tephritidae.

== Distribution ==
Kenya.
