= Deroparia reticulata =

Scientific classification
- Kingdom: Animalia
- Phylum: Arthropoda
- Class: Insecta
- Order: Diptera
- Family: Tephritidae
- Subfamily: Tephritinae
- Tribe: Tephritini
- Genus: Deroparia
- Species: D. reticulata

Binomial name
- Deroparia reticulata (Munro, 1929)

Synonyms
- Ensina reticulata Munro, 1929

Species of fly

Deroparia reticulata is a species of tephritid or fruit flies in the genus Deroparia of the family Tephritidae.

== Distribution ==
Namibia.
