= Cryptophorellia stuckenbergi =

Scientific classification
- Kingdom: Animalia
- Phylum: Arthropoda
- Class: Insecta
- Order: Diptera
- Family: Tephritidae
- Subfamily: Tephritinae
- Tribe: Tephritini
- Genus: Cryptophorellia
- Species: C. stuckenbergi

Binomial name
- Cryptophorellia stuckenbergi Freidberg & Hancock, 1989

Species of fly

Cryptophorellia stuckenbergi is a species of tephritid or fruit flies in the genus Cryptophorellia of the family Tephritidae.

== Distribution ==
Madagascar.
