= Telaletes ochracea =

Scientific classification
- Kingdom: Animalia
- Phylum: Arthropoda
- Class: Insecta
- Order: Diptera
- Family: Tephritidae
- Subfamily: Tephritinae
- Tribe: Tephritini
- Genus: Telaletes
- Species: T. ochracea

Binomial name
- Telaletes ochracea (Loew, 1861)

Synonyms
- Trypeta ochracea Loew, 1861

Species of fly

Telaletes ochracea is a species of tephritid or fruit flies in the genus Telaletes of the family Tephritidae.

== Distribution ==
Zimbabwe, South Africa, Kenya.
