= Euryphalara barnardi =

Scientific classification
- Kingdom: Animalia
- Phylum: Arthropoda
- Class: Insecta
- Order: Diptera
- Family: Tephritidae
- Subfamily: Tephritinae
- Tribe: Tephritini
- Genus: Euryphalara
- Species: E. barnardi

Binomial name
- Euryphalara barnardi (Bezzi, 1924)

Synonyms
- Ensina barnardi Munro, 1929

Species of fly

Euryphalara barnardi is a species of tephritid or fruit flies in the genus Euryphalara of the family Tephritidae.

== Distribution ==
Namibia, South Africa.
