= Hyalopeza schneiderae =

Scientific classification
- Kingdom: Animalia
- Phylum: Arthropoda
- Clade: Pancrustacea
- Class: Insecta
- Order: Diptera
- Family: Tephritidae
- Subfamily: Tephritinae
- Tribe: Tephritini
- Genus: Hyalopeza
- Species: H. schneiderae

Binomial name
- Hyalopeza schneiderae Munro, 1957

Species of fly

Hyalopeza schneiderae is a species of tephritid or fruit flies in the genus Hyalopeza of the family Tephritidae.

== Distribution ==
Australia.
