= Paraactinoptera danielsi =

Scientific classification
- Kingdom: Animalia
- Phylum: Arthropoda
- Clade: Pancrustacea
- Class: Insecta
- Order: Diptera
- Family: Tephritidae
- Subfamily: Tephritinae
- Tribe: Tephritini
- Genus: Paraactinoptera
- Species: P. danielsi

Binomial name
- Paraactinoptera danielsi Hancock & Drew, 2003

Species of fly

Paraactinoptera danielsi is a species of tephritid or fruit flies in the genus Paraactinoptera of the family Tephritidae.

== Distribution ==
Australia.
