= Homoeotricha atrata =

Scientific classification
- Kingdom: Animalia
- Phylum: Arthropoda
- Class: Insecta
- Order: Diptera
- Family: Tephritidae
- Subfamily: Tephritinae
- Tribe: Tephritini
- Genus: Homoeotricha
- Species: H. atrata

Binomial name
- Homoeotricha atrata (Wang, 1990)

Synonyms
- Gonioxyna atrata Wang, 1990

Species of fly

Homoeotricha atrata is a species of tephritid or fruit flies in the genus Homoeotricha of the family Tephritidae.

== Distribution ==
China.
