= Acronneus bryanti =

Scientific classification
- Kingdom: Animalia
- Phylum: Arthropoda
- Class: Insecta
- Order: Diptera
- Family: Tephritidae
- Subfamily: Tephritinae
- Tribe: Tephritini
- Genus: Acronneus
- Species: A. bryanti

Binomial name
- Acronneus bryanti (Munro, 1929)

Synonyms
- Parafreutreta bryanti Munro, 1929

Species of fly

Acronneus bryanti is a species of tephritid or fruit flies in the genus Acronneus of the family Tephritidae.

== Distribution ==
South Africa.
