= Ptosanthus helvus =

Scientific classification
- Kingdom: Animalia
- Phylum: Arthropoda
- Class: Insecta
- Order: Diptera
- Family: Tephritidae
- Subfamily: Tephritinae
- Tribe: Tephritini
- Genus: Ptosanthus
- Species: P. helvus

Binomial name
- Ptosanthus helvus (Loew, 1869)

Synonyms
- Trypeta helva Loew, 1869; Euribia lightfooti Bezzi, 1924; Mesoclanis trifasciata Hering, 1939; Paroxyna zavattariana Hering, 1952

Species of fly

Ptosanthus planifrons is a species of tephritid or fruit flies in the genus Ptosanthus of the family Tephritidae.

== Distribution ==
Ethiopia, Uganda, Kenya, South Africa.
