= Tanaica hyalipennis =

Scientific classification
- Kingdom: Animalia
- Phylum: Arthropoda
- Class: Insecta
- Order: Diptera
- Family: Tephritidae
- Subfamily: Tephritinae
- Tribe: Tephritini
- Genus: Tanaica
- Species: T. hyalipennis

Binomial name
- Tanaica hyalipennis (Bezzi, 1924)

Synonyms
- Ensina hyalipennis Bezzi, 1924

Species of fly

Tanaica hyalipennis is a species of tephritid or fruit flies in the genus Tanaica of the family Tephritidae.

== Distribution ==
Namibia, South Africa.
