= Parafreutreta vumbae =

Scientific classification
- Kingdom: Animalia
- Phylum: Arthropoda
- Class: Insecta
- Order: Diptera
- Family: Tephritidae
- Subfamily: Tephritinae
- Tribe: Tephritini
- Genus: Parafreutreta
- Species: P. vumbae

Binomial name
- Parafreutreta vumbae Hancock, 1986

Species of fly

Parafreutreta vumbae is a species of tephritid or fruit flies in the genus Parafreutreta of the family Tephritidae.

== Distribution ==
Zimbabwe.
