= Telaletes obscurata =

Scientific classification
- Kingdom: Animalia
- Phylum: Arthropoda
- Class: Insecta
- Order: Diptera
- Family: Tephritidae
- Subfamily: Tephritinae
- Tribe: Tephritini
- Genus: Telaletes
- Species: T. obscurata

Binomial name
- Telaletes obscurata Munro, 1957

Species of fly

Telaletes obscurata is a species of tephritid or fruit flies in the genus Telaletes of the family Tephritidae.

== Distribution ==
Uganda, Kenya.
