= Lethyna blaesa =

Scientific classification
- Kingdom: Animalia
- Phylum: Arthropoda
- Class: Insecta
- Order: Diptera
- Family: Tephritidae
- Subfamily: Tephritinae
- Tribe: Tephritini
- Genus: Lethyna
- Species: L. blaesa

Binomial name
- Lethyna blaesa Munro, 1957

Species of fly

Lethyna blaesa is a species of tephritid or fruit flies in the genus Lethyna of the family Tephritidae.

== Distribution ==
Uganda.
