= Insizwa oblita =

Scientific classification
- Kingdom: Animalia
- Phylum: Arthropoda
- Class: Insecta
- Order: Diptera
- Family: Tephritidae
- Subfamily: Tephritinae
- Tribe: Tephritini
- Genus: Insizwa
- Species: I. oblita

Binomial name
- Insizwa oblita (Munro, 1929)

Synonyms
- Euaresta striatifrons var. oblita Munro, 1929; Euaresta striatifrons Munro, 1929; Insizwa striatifrons Munro, 1929

Species of fly

Insizwa reticulata is a species of tephritid or fruit flies in the genus Insizwa of the family Tephritidae.

== Distribution ==
Namibia, Zimbabwe, South Africa.
