= Collessomyia setiger =

Scientific classification
- Kingdom: Animalia
- Phylum: Arthropoda
- Clade: Pancrustacea
- Class: Insecta
- Order: Diptera
- Family: Tephritidae
- Subfamily: Tephritinae
- Tribe: Tephritini
- Genus: Collessomyia
- Species: C. setiger

Binomial name
- Collessomyia setiger Hardy & Drew, 1996

Species of fly

Collessomyia setiger is a species of tephritid or fruit flies in the genus Collessomyia of the family Tephritidae.

== Distribution ==
Australia.
