= Gymnosagena campiglossina =

Scientific classification
- Kingdom: Animalia
- Phylum: Arthropoda
- Class: Insecta
- Order: Diptera
- Family: Tephritidae
- Subfamily: Tephritinae
- Tribe: Tephritini
- Genus: Gymnosagena
- Species: G. campiglossina

Binomial name
- Gymnosagena campiglossina Freidberg & Merz, 2006

Species of fly

Gymnosagena campiglossina is a species of tephritid or fruit flies in the genus Gymnosagena of the family Tephritidae.

== Distribution ==
Madagascar.
