= Hyalotephritis planiscutellata =

Scientific classification
- Kingdom: Animalia
- Phylum: Arthropoda
- Class: Insecta
- Order: Diptera
- Family: Tephritidae
- Subfamily: Tephritinae
- Tribe: Tephritini
- Genus: Hyalotephritis
- Species: H. planiscutellata

Binomial name
- Hyalotephritis planiscutellata (Becker, 1903)

Synonyms
- Trypeta planiscutellata Becker, 1903

Species of fly

Hyalotephritis planiscutellata is a species of tephritid or fruit flies in the genus Hyalotephritis of the family Tephritidae.

== Distribution ==
Israel, Egypt, Ethiopia.
