= Dectodesis eminens =

Scientific classification
- Kingdom: Animalia
- Phylum: Arthropoda
- Class: Insecta
- Order: Diptera
- Family: Tephritidae
- Subfamily: Tephritinae
- Tribe: Tephritini
- Genus: Dectodesis
- Species: D. eminens

Binomial name
- Dectodesis eminens (Hering, 1942)

Synonyms
- Trypanea eminens Hering, 1942

Species of fly

Dectodesis eminens is a species of tephritid or fruit flies in the genus Dectodesis of the family Tephritidae.

== Distribution ==
Tanzania.
