= Neosphaeniscus flexuosus =

Scientific classification
- Kingdom: Animalia
- Phylum: Arthropoda
- Class: Insecta
- Order: Diptera
- Family: Tephritidae
- Subfamily: Tephritinae
- Tribe: Tephritini
- Genus: Neosphaeniscus
- Species: N. flexuosus

Binomial name
- Neosphaeniscus flexuosus (Bigot, 1857)

Synonyms
- Urophora flexuosa Bigot, 1857

Species of fly

Neosphaeniscus flexuosus is a species of tephritid or fruit flies in the genus Neosphaeniscus of the family Tephritidae.

== Distribution ==
Chile.
