= Antoxya oxynoides =

Scientific classification
- Kingdom: Animalia
- Phylum: Arthropoda
- Class: Insecta
- Order: Diptera
- Family: Tephritidae
- Subfamily: Tephritinae
- Tribe: Tephritini
- Genus: Antoxya
- Species: A. oxynoides

Binomial name
- Antoxya oxynoides Bezzi, 1924

Synonyms
- Euribia oxynoides Bezzi, 1924; Oxyna africana Hering, 1941

Species of fly

Antoxya oxynoides is a species of tephritid or fruit flies in the genus Antoxya of the family Tephritidae.

== Distribution ==
Ethiopia, Uganda, Kenya, Tanzania.
