= Homoeotricha brevicornis =

Scientific classification
- Kingdom: Animalia
- Phylum: Arthropoda
- Class: Insecta
- Order: Diptera
- Family: Tephritidae
- Subfamily: Tephritinae
- Tribe: Tephritini
- Genus: Homoeotricha
- Species: H. brevicornis

Binomial name
- Homoeotricha brevicornis (Chen, 1938)

Synonyms
- Gonioxyna brevicornis Shiraki, 1933; Costogonia nuchticollecta Dirlbek & Dirlbek, 1971

Species of fly

Homoeotricha brevicornis is a species of tephritid or fruit flies in the genus Homoeotricha of the family Tephritidae.

== Distribution ==
Russia, Mongolia, China.
