= Migmella amplifrons =

Scientific classification
- Kingdom: Animalia
- Phylum: Arthropoda
- Class: Insecta
- Order: Diptera
- Family: Tephritidae
- Subfamily: Tephritinae
- Tribe: Tephritini
- Genus: Migmella
- Species: M. amplifrons

Binomial name
- Migmella amplifrons (Bezzi, 1920)

Synonyms
- Euaresta amplifrons Bezzi, 1920

Species of fly

Migmella amplifrons is a species of tephritid or fruit flies in the genus Migmella of the family Tephritidae.

== Distribution ==
- South Africa
