= Brachytrupanea brachystigma =

Scientific classification
- Kingdom: Animalia
- Phylum: Arthropoda
- Class: Insecta
- Order: Diptera
- Family: Tephritidae
- Subfamily: Tephritinae
- Tribe: Tephritini
- Genus: Brachytrupanea
- Species: B. brachystigma

Binomial name
- Brachytrupanea brachystigma (Bezzi, 1924)

Synonyms
- Trypanea brachystigma Bezzi, 1924

Species of fly

Brachytrupanea brachystigma is a species of tephritid or fruit flies in the genus Brachytrupanea of the family Tephritidae.

== Distribution ==
Malawi, South Africa.
