= Marriottella sepsoides =

Scientific classification
- Kingdom: Animalia
- Phylum: Arthropoda
- Class: Insecta
- Order: Diptera
- Family: Tephritidae
- Subfamily: Tephritinae
- Tribe: Tephritini
- Genus: Marriottella
- Species: M. sepsoides

Binomial name
- Marriottella sepsoides Freidberg & Merz, 2006

Species of fly

Marriottella sepsoides is a species of tephritid or fruit flies in the genus Marriottella of the family Tephritidae. They have a wing length of less than 2 mm and feed on the flowerheads of Helichrysum. They are mainly found in South Africa.
