= Cooronga mcalpinei =

Scientific classification
- Kingdom: Animalia
- Phylum: Arthropoda
- Clade: Pancrustacea
- Class: Insecta
- Order: Diptera
- Family: Tephritidae
- Subfamily: Tephritinae
- Tribe: Tephritini
- Genus: Cooronga
- Species: C. mcalpinei

Binomial name
- Cooronga mcalpinei Hardy & Drew, 1996

Species of fly

Cooronga mcalpinei is a species of tephritid or fruit flies in the genus Cooronga of the family Tephritidae.

== Distribution ==
Australia.
