= Heringina guttata =

Scientific classification
- Kingdom: Animalia
- Phylum: Arthropoda
- Class: Insecta
- Order: Diptera
- Family: Tephritidae
- Subfamily: Tephritinae
- Tribe: Tephritini
- Genus: Heringina
- Species: H. guttata

Binomial name
- Heringina guttata (Fallén, 1814)

Synonyms
- Tephritis guttata Fallén, 1814; Trypeta gemmata Meigen, 1826; Tephritis guttata Fallén, 1820

Species of fly

Heringina guttata is a species of tephritid or fruit flies in the genus Heringina of the family Tephritidae.

== Distribution ==
Sweden, Finland, Central Europe, Ukraine, Caucasus, Kazakhstan.
