= Peneparoxyna minuta =

Scientific classification
- Kingdom: Animalia
- Phylum: Arthropoda
- Clade: Pancrustacea
- Class: Insecta
- Order: Diptera
- Family: Tephritidae
- Subfamily: Tephritinae
- Tribe: Tephritini
- Genus: Peneparoxyna
- Species: P. minuta

Binomial name
- Peneparoxyna minuta Hardy & Drew, 1996

Species of fly

Peneparoxyna minuta is a species of tephritid or fruit flies in the genus Peneparoxyna of the family Tephritidae.

== Distribution ==
Australia.
