= Marriottella exquisita =

Scientific classification
- Kingdom: Animalia
- Phylum: Arthropoda
- Class: Insecta
- Order: Diptera
- Family: Tephritidae
- Subfamily: Tephritinae
- Tribe: Tephritini
- Genus: Marriottella
- Species: M. exquisita

Binomial name
- Marriottella exquisita Munro, 1939

Species of fly

Marriottella exquisita is a species of tephritid or fruit flies in the genus Marriottella of the family Tephritidae.

== Distribution ==
South Africa.
