= Homoeotricha arisanica =

Scientific classification
- Kingdom: Animalia
- Phylum: Arthropoda
- Class: Insecta
- Order: Diptera
- Family: Tephritidae
- Subfamily: Tephritinae
- Tribe: Tephritini
- Genus: Homoeotricha
- Species: H. arisanica

Binomial name
- Homoeotricha arisanica (Shiraki, 1933)

Synonyms
- Paroxyna arisanica Shiraki, 1933

Species of fly

Homoeotricha arisanica is a species of tephritid or fruit flies in the genus Homoeotricha of the family Tephritidae.

== Distribution ==
Taiwan.
