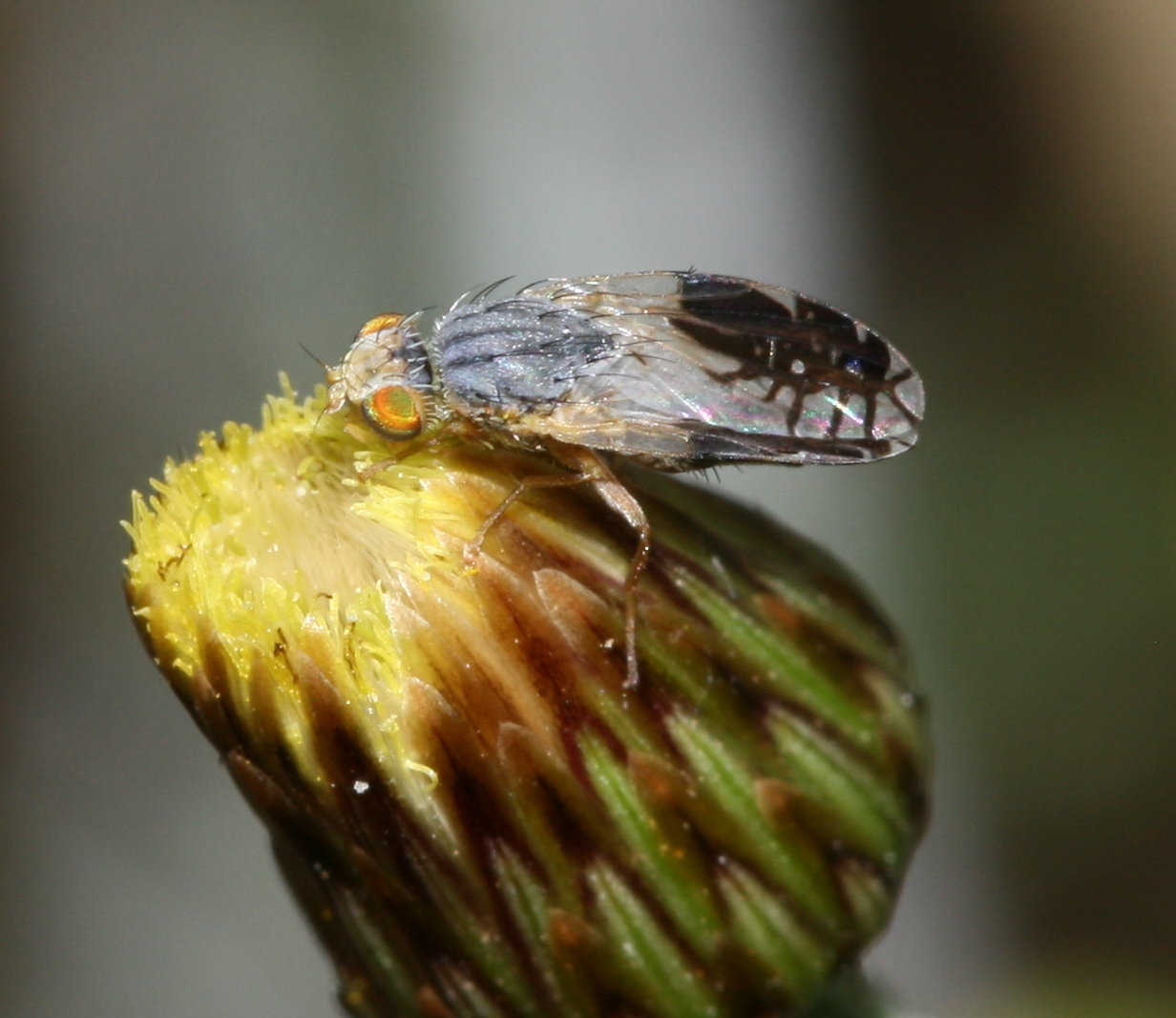

Scientific classification
- Kingdom: Animalia
- Phylum: Arthropoda
- Class: Insecta
- Order: Diptera
- Family: Tephritidae
- Subfamily: Tephritinae
- Tribe: Tephritini
- Genus: Capitites
- Species: C. ramulosa

Binomial name
- Capitites ramulosa Loew, 1844

Synonyms
- Trypeta ramulosa Loew, 1844; Urellia perfecta Becker, 1908; Urophora radiata Macquart, 1847

= Capitites ramulosa =

Species of fly

Capitites ramulosa is a species of tephritid or fruit flies in the genus Capitites of the family Tephritidae.

== Distribution ==
Europe, North Africa, Syria, Israel, Canary Islands.
