= Dectodesis confluens =

Scientific classification
- Kingdom: Animalia
- Phylum: Arthropoda
- Clade: Pancrustacea
- Class: Insecta
- Order: Diptera
- Family: Tephritidae
- Subfamily: Tephritinae
- Tribe: Tephritini
- Genus: Dectodesis
- Species: D. confluens

Binomial name
- Dectodesis confluens (Wiedemann, 1830)

Synonyms
- Trypeta confluens Wiedemann, 1830

Species of fly

Dectodesis confluens is a species of tephritid or fruit flies in the genus Dectodesis of the family Tephritidae.

== Distribution ==
Tanzania.
