= Dectodesis katomborae =

Scientific classification
- Kingdom: Animalia
- Phylum: Arthropoda
- Class: Insecta
- Order: Diptera
- Family: Tephritidae
- Subfamily: Tephritinae
- Tribe: Tephritini
- Genus: Dectodesis
- Species: D. katomborae

Binomial name
- Dectodesis katomborae Hancock, 1986

Species of fly

Dectodesis katomborae is a species of tephritid or fruit flies in the genus Dectodesis of the family Tephritidae.

== Distribution ==
Zimbabwe.
