= Homoeotricha leporis =

Scientific classification
- Kingdom: Animalia
- Phylum: Arthropoda
- Class: Insecta
- Order: Diptera
- Family: Tephritidae
- Subfamily: Tephritinae
- Tribe: Tephritini
- Genus: Homoeotricha
- Species: H. leporis

Binomial name
- Homoeotricha leporis Korneyev, 1993

Species of fly

Homoeotricha leporis is a species of tephritid or fruit flies in the genus Homoeotricha of the family Tephritidae.

== Distribution ==
Kyrgyzstan, Kazakhstan.
