= Euryphalara mecistocephala =

Scientific classification
- Kingdom: Animalia
- Phylum: Arthropoda
- Class: Insecta
- Order: Diptera
- Family: Tephritidae
- Subfamily: Tephritinae
- Tribe: Tephritini
- Genus: Euryphalara
- Species: E. mecistocephala

Binomial name
- Euryphalara mecistocephala (Munro, 1929)

Synonyms
- Ensina mecistocephala Munro, 1929; Euryphalara barnardi var. extensa Munro, 1938

Species of fly

Euryphalara mecistocephala is a species of tephritid or fruit flies in the genus Euryphalara of the family Tephritidae.

== Distribution ==
Namibia.
