= Brachytrupanea semiatrata =

Scientific classification
- Kingdom: Animalia
- Phylum: Arthropoda
- Class: Insecta
- Order: Diptera
- Family: Tephritidae
- Subfamily: Tephritinae
- Tribe: Tephritini
- Genus: Brachytrupanea
- Species: B. semiatrata

Binomial name
- Brachytrupanea semiatrata (Hering, 1942)

Synonyms
- Trypanea semiatrata Hering, 1942

Species of fly

Brachytrupanea semiatrata is a species of tephritid or fruit flies in the genus Brachytrupanea of the family Tephritidae.

== Distribution ==
Tanzania.
