= Paraspathulina apicomacula =

Scientific classification
- Kingdom: Animalia
- Phylum: Arthropoda
- Clade: Pancrustacea
- Class: Insecta
- Order: Diptera
- Family: Tephritidae
- Subfamily: Tephritinae
- Tribe: Tephritini
- Genus: Paraspathulina
- Species: P. apicomacula

Binomial name
- Paraspathulina apicomacula Hardy & Drew, 1996

Synonyms
- Paraspathulina apicomaculata Norrbom, Carroll, Thompson, White & Freidberg, 1999

Species of fly

Paraspathulina apicomacula is a species of tephritid or fruit flies in the genus Paraspathulina of the family Tephritidae.

== Distribution ==
Australia.
