= Oxyparna melanostigmata =

Scientific classification
- Kingdom: Animalia
- Phylum: Arthropoda
- Class: Insecta
- Order: Diptera
- Family: Tephritidae
- Subfamily: Tephritinae
- Tribe: Tephritini
- Genus: Oxyparna
- Species: O. melanostigmata

Binomial name
- Oxyparna melanostigmata Korneyev, 1990

Species of fly

Oxyparna melanostigmata is a species of tephritid or fruit flies in the genus Oxyparna of the family Tephritidae.

== Distribution ==
Kyrgyzstan, Mongolia.
