= Lethyna evanida =

Scientific classification
- Kingdom: Animalia
- Phylum: Arthropoda
- Class: Insecta
- Order: Diptera
- Family: Tephritidae
- Subfamily: Tephritinae
- Tribe: Tephritini
- Genus: Lethyna
- Species: L. evanida

Binomial name
- Lethyna evanida (Bezzi, 1924)

Synonyms
- Ensina evanida Bezzi, 1924

Species of fly

Lethyna evanida is a species of tephritid or fruit flies in the genus Lethyna of the family Tephritidae.

== Distribution ==
Ethiopia.
