= Oedosphenella auriella =

Scientific classification
- Kingdom: Animalia
- Phylum: Arthropoda
- Class: Insecta
- Order: Diptera
- Family: Tephritidae
- Subfamily: Tephritinae
- Tribe: Tephritini
- Genus: Oedosphenella
- Species: O. auriella

Binomial name
- Oedosphenella auriella (Munro, 1939)

Synonyms
- Oedaspis auriella Munro, 1939)

Species of fly

Oedosphenella auriella is a species of tephritid or fruit flies in the genus Oedosphenella of the family Tephritidae.

== Distribution ==
South Africa.
