= Soraida tenebricosa =

Scientific classification
- Kingdom: Animalia
- Phylum: Arthropoda
- Class: Insecta
- Order: Diptera
- Family: Tephritidae
- Subfamily: Tephritinae
- Tribe: Tephritini
- Genus: Soraida
- Species: S. tenebricosa

Binomial name
- Soraida tenebricosa Hering, 1941

Species of fly

Soraida tenebricosa is a species of tephritid or fruit flies in the genus Soraida of the family Tephritidae.

== Distribution ==
Indonesia.
