= Orthocanthoides aristae =

Scientific classification
- Kingdom: Animalia
- Phylum: Arthropoda
- Class: Insecta
- Order: Diptera
- Family: Tephritidae
- Subfamily: Tephritinae
- Tribe: Tephritini
- Genus: Orthocanthoides
- Species: O. aristae

Binomial name
- Orthocanthoides aristae Freidberg, 1987

Species of fly

Orthocanthoides aristae is a species of tephritid or fruit flies in the genus Orthocanthoides of the family Tephritidae.

== Distribution ==
Kenya.
