= Lamproxyna nitidula =

Scientific classification
- Kingdom: Animalia
- Phylum: Arthropoda
- Class: Insecta
- Order: Diptera
- Family: Tephritidae
- Subfamily: Tephritinae
- Tribe: Tephritini
- Genus: Lamproxyna
- Species: L. nitidula

Binomial name
- Lamproxyna nitidula Hendel, 1914

Species of fly

Lamproxyna nitidula is a species of tephritid or fruit flies in the genus Lamproxyna of the family Tephritidae.

== Distribution ==
Peru, Bolivia.
