= Elgonina pollinosa =

Scientific classification
- Kingdom: Animalia
- Phylum: Arthropoda
- Class: Insecta
- Order: Diptera
- Family: Tephritidae
- Subfamily: Tephritinae
- Tribe: Tephritini
- Genus: Elgonina
- Species: E. pollinosa

Binomial name
- Elgonina pollinosa Freidberg & Merz, 2006

Species of fly

Elgonina pollinosa is a species of tephritid or fruit flies in the genus Elgonina of the family Tephritidae.

== Distribution ==
The Elgonina pollinosa is found in Ethiopia, Africa.
