= Pherothrinax woodi =

Scientific classification
- Kingdom: Animalia
- Phylum: Arthropoda
- Class: Insecta
- Order: Diptera
- Family: Tephritidae
- Subfamily: Tephritinae
- Tribe: Tephritini
- Genus: Pherothrinax
- Species: P. woodi

Binomial name
- Pherothrinax woodi (Bezzi, 1924)

Synonyms
- Trypanea woodi Bezzi, 1924; Tripanea woodi Bezzi, 1924

Species of fly

Pherothrinax woodi is a species of tephritid or fruit flies in the genus Pherothrinax of the family Tephritidae.

== Distribution ==
Ethiopia, Tanzania, Malawi, Mozambique, Zimbabwe.
