= Dectodesis luctans =

Scientific classification
- Kingdom: Animalia
- Phylum: Arthropoda
- Class: Insecta
- Order: Diptera
- Family: Tephritidae
- Subfamily: Tephritinae
- Tribe: Tephritini
- Genus: Dectodesis
- Species: D. luctans

Binomial name
- Dectodesis luctans (Munro, 1929)

Synonyms
- Trypanea luctans Munro, 1929

Species of fly

Dectodesis luctans is a species of tephritid or fruit flies in the genus Dectodesis of the family Tephritidae.

== Distribution ==
South Africa.
