= Mastigolina rufocomata =

Scientific classification
- Kingdom: Animalia
- Phylum: Arthropoda
- Class: Insecta
- Order: Diptera
- Family: Tephritidae
- Subfamily: Tephritinae
- Tribe: Tephritini
- Genus: Mastigolina
- Species: M. rufocomata

Binomial name
- Mastigolina rufocomata Munro, 1947

Species of fly

Mastigolina rufocomata is a species of tephritid or fruit flies in the genus Mastigolina of the family Tephritidae.

== Distribution ==
Kenya.
