= Homoeothrix lindigi =

Scientific classification
- Kingdom: Animalia
- Phylum: Arthropoda
- Class: Insecta
- Order: Diptera
- Family: Tephritidae
- Subfamily: Tephritinae
- Tribe: Tephritini
- Genus: Homoeothrix
- Species: H. lindigi

Binomial name
- Homoeothrix lindigi (Hendel, 1914)

Synonyms
- Euribia lindigi Hendel, 1914

Species of fly

Homoeothrix lindigi is a species of tephritid or fruit flies in the genus Homoeothrix of the family Tephritidae.
