= Homoeotricha longipennis =

Scientific classification
- Kingdom: Animalia
- Phylum: Arthropoda
- Class: Insecta
- Order: Diptera
- Family: Tephritidae
- Subfamily: Tephritinae
- Tribe: Tephritini
- Genus: Homoeotricha
- Species: H. longipennis

Binomial name
- Homoeotricha longipennis (Shiraki, 1933)

Synonyms
- Campiglossa longipennis Shiraki, 1933; Gonioxyna paradigma Hering, 1941

Species of fly

Homoeotricha longipennis is a species of tephritid or fruit flies in the genus Homoeotricha of the family Tephritidae.

== Distribution ==
Korea, East Russia, Japan.
