= Mastigolina bequaerti =

Scientific classification
- Kingdom: Animalia
- Phylum: Arthropoda
- Class: Insecta
- Order: Diptera
- Family: Tephritidae
- Subfamily: Tephritinae
- Tribe: Tephritini
- Genus: Mastigolina
- Species: M. bequaerti

Binomial name
- Mastigolina bequaerti Munro, 1934

Synonyms
- Pliomelaena bequaerti Munro, 1934

Species of fly

Mastigolina bequaerti is a species of tephritid or fruit flies in the genus Mastigolina of the family Tephritidae.

== Distribution ==
Sierra Leone, Liberia.
