= Axiothauma nigrinitens =

Scientific classification
- Kingdom: Animalia
- Phylum: Arthropoda
- Class: Insecta
- Order: Diptera
- Family: Tephritidae
- Subfamily: Tephritinae
- Tribe: Tephritini
- Genus: Axiothauma
- Species: A. nigrinitens

Binomial name
- Axiothauma nigrinitens Munro, 1946

Species of fly

Axiothauma nigrinitens is a species of tephritid or fruit flies in the genus Axiothauma of the family Tephritidae.

== Distribution ==
Kenya.
