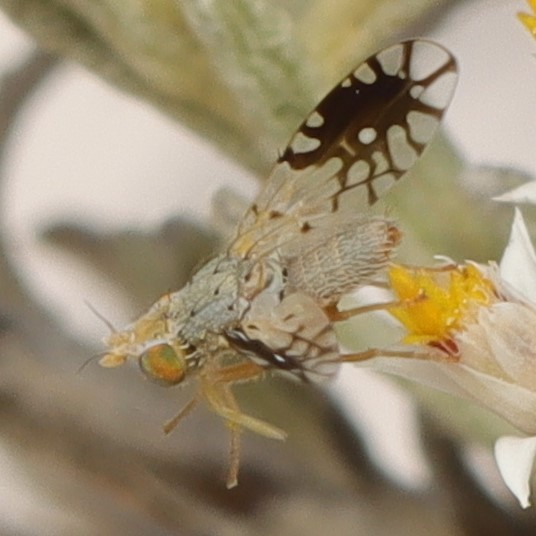

Scientific classification
- Kingdom: Animalia
- Phylum: Arthropoda
- Class: Insecta
- Order: Diptera
- Family: Tephritidae
- Subfamily: Tephritinae
- Tribe: Tephritini
- Genus: Brachydesis
- Species: B. rivularis

Binomial name
- Brachydesis rivularis (Bezzi, 1924)

Synonyms
- Trypanea rivularis Bezzi, 1924

= Brachydesis rivularis =

Species of fly

Brachydesis rivularis is a species of tephritid or fruit fly in the family Tephritidae.

== Distribution ==
South Africa.
