= Neosphaeniscus m-nigrum =

Scientific classification
- Kingdom: Animalia
- Phylum: Arthropoda
- Class: Insecta
- Order: Diptera
- Family: Tephritidae
- Subfamily: Tephritinae
- Tribe: Tephritini
- Genus: Neosphaeniscus
- Species: N. m-nigrum

Binomial name
- Neosphaeniscus m-nigrum Hendel, 1914

Synonyms
- Euribia m-nigrum Hendel, 1914

Species of fly

Neosphaeniscus m-nigrum is a species of tephritid or fruit flies in the genus Neosphaeniscus of the family Tephritidae.

== Distribution ==
Argentina.
