= Dectodesis spatiosa =

Scientific classification
- Kingdom: Animalia
- Phylum: Arthropoda
- Class: Insecta
- Order: Diptera
- Family: Tephritidae
- Subfamily: Tephritinae
- Tribe: Tephritini
- Genus: Dectodesis
- Species: D. spatiosa

Binomial name
- Dectodesis spatiosa (Munro, 1954)

Synonyms
- Trupanea spatiosa Munro, 1954

Species of fly

Dectodesis spatiosa is a species of tephritid or fruit flies in the genus Dectodesis of the family Tephritidae.

== Distribution ==
Madagascar.
