= Lamproxyna titschacki =

Scientific classification
- Kingdom: Animalia
- Phylum: Arthropoda
- Class: Insecta
- Order: Diptera
- Family: Tephritidae
- Subfamily: Tephritinae
- Tribe: Tephritini
- Genus: Lamproxyna
- Species: L. titschacki

Binomial name
- Lamproxyna titschacki Hering, 1941

Species of fly

Lamproxyna titschacki is a species of tephritid or fruit flies in the genus Lamproxyna of the family Tephritidae.

== Distribution ==
Peru, Bolivia.
