= Namwambina festinata =

Scientific classification
- Kingdom: Animalia
- Phylum: Arthropoda
- Class: Insecta
- Order: Diptera
- Family: Tephritidae
- Subfamily: Tephritinae
- Tribe: Tephritini
- Genus: Namwambina
- Species: N. elgonensis

Binomial name
- Namwambina elgonensis Munro, 1957

Species of fly

Namwambina elgonensis is a species of tephritid or fruit flies in the genus Namwambina of the family Tephritidae.

== Distribution ==
Kenya.
