= Dectodesis bulligera =

Scientific classification
- Kingdom: Animalia
- Phylum: Arthropoda
- Class: Insecta
- Order: Diptera
- Family: Tephritidae
- Subfamily: Tephritinae
- Tribe: Tephritini
- Genus: Dectodesis
- Species: D. bulligera

Binomial name
- Dectodesis bulligera (Bezzi, 1924)

Synonyms
- Trypanea bulligera Bezzi, 1924

Species of fly

Dectodesis bulligera is a species of tephritid or fruit flies in the genus Dectodesis of the family Tephritidae.

== Distribution ==
South Africa.
