= Peratomixis miranda =

Scientific classification
- Kingdom: Animalia
- Phylum: Arthropoda
- Class: Insecta
- Order: Diptera
- Family: Tephritidae
- Subfamily: Tephritinae
- Tribe: Tephritini
- Genus: Peratomixis
- Species: P. miranda

Binomial name
- Peratomixis miranda Munro, 1947

Species of fly

Peratomixis miranda is a species of tephritid or fruit flies in the genus Peratomixis of the family Tephritidae.

== Distribution ==
Lesotho.
