= Elgonina fuscana =

Scientific classification
- Kingdom: Animalia
- Phylum: Arthropoda
- Class: Insecta
- Order: Diptera
- Family: Tephritidae
- Subfamily: Tephritinae
- Tribe: Tephritini
- Genus: Elgonina
- Species: E. fuscana

Binomial name
- Elgonina fuscana Munro, 1957

Species of fly

Elgonina fuscana is a species of tephritid or fruit flies in the genus Elgonina of the family Tephritidae.

== Distribution ==
The Elgonina fuscana is found in Uganda, Africa.
