= Ptosanthus aida =

Scientific classification
- Kingdom: Animalia
- Phylum: Arthropoda
- Class: Insecta
- Order: Diptera
- Family: Tephritidae
- Subfamily: Tephritinae
- Tribe: Tephritini
- Genus: Ptosanthus
- Species: P. aida

Binomial name
- Ptosanthus aida (Hering, 1937)

Synonyms
- Paroxyna aida Hering, 1937

Species of fly

Ptosanthus aida is a species of tephritid or fruit flies in the genus Ptosanthus of the family Tephritidae.

== Distribution ==
Ethiopia.
