= Freidbergia mirabilis =

Scientific classification
- Kingdom: Animalia
- Phylum: Arthropoda
- Class: Insecta
- Order: Diptera
- Family: Tephritidae
- Subfamily: Tephritinae
- Tribe: Tephritini
- Genus: Freidbergia
- Species: F. mirabilis

Binomial name
- Freidbergia mirabilis Merz, 1999

Species of fruit fly

Freidbergia mirabilis is a species of tephritid or fruit flies in the genus Freidbergia of the family Tephritidae.

== Distribution ==
Ethiopia, Kenya, Uganda, Tanzania.
