= Euthauma ghentianum =

Scientific classification
- Kingdom: Animalia
- Phylum: Arthropoda
- Class: Insecta
- Order: Diptera
- Family: Tephritidae
- Subfamily: Tephritinae
- Tribe: Tephritini
- Genus: Euthauma
- Species: E. ghentianum

Binomial name
- Euthauma ghentianum Munro, 1949

Species of fly

Euthauma ghentianum is a species of tephritid or fruit flies in the genus Euthauma of the family Tephritidae.

E. ghentianum induces galls on the stems of Schistostephium crataegifolium which vary in size and shape. On main stems they are elongate and spindle shaped, about 20-25mm long and 5-7mm wide, and the stem grows past the gall. The galls become globose and the shoot ceases to grow when on side shoots.

== Distribution ==
South Africa.
