= Tephritoresta debilis =

Scientific classification
- Kingdom: Animalia
- Phylum: Arthropoda
- Class: Insecta
- Order: Diptera
- Family: Tephritidae
- Subfamily: Tephritinae
- Tribe: Tephritini
- Genus: Tephritoresta
- Species: T. debilis

Binomial name
- Tephritoresta debilis Hering, 1942

Species of fly

Tephritoresta debilis is a species of tephritid or fruit flies in the genus Tephritoresta of the family Tephritidae.

== Distribution ==
Togo.
