= Bezzina nigrapex =

Scientific classification
- Kingdom: Animalia
- Phylum: Arthropoda
- Class: Insecta
- Order: Diptera
- Family: Tephritidae
- Subfamily: Tephritinae
- Tribe: Tephrellini
- Genus: Bezzina
- Species: B. nigrapex

Binomial name
- Bezzina nigrapex Munro, 1937

Species of fly

Bezzina nigrapex is a species of tephritid or fruit flies in the genus Bezzina of the family Tephritidae.

It is found in South Africa.
