= Donara =

Scientific classification
- Kingdom: Animalia
- Phylum: Arthropoda
- Class: Insecta
- Order: Diptera
- Family: Tephritidae
- Subfamily: Tephritinae
- Tribe: Tephritini
- Genus: Donara

Genus of flies

Donara is a genus of the family Tephritidae, better known as fruit flies.
