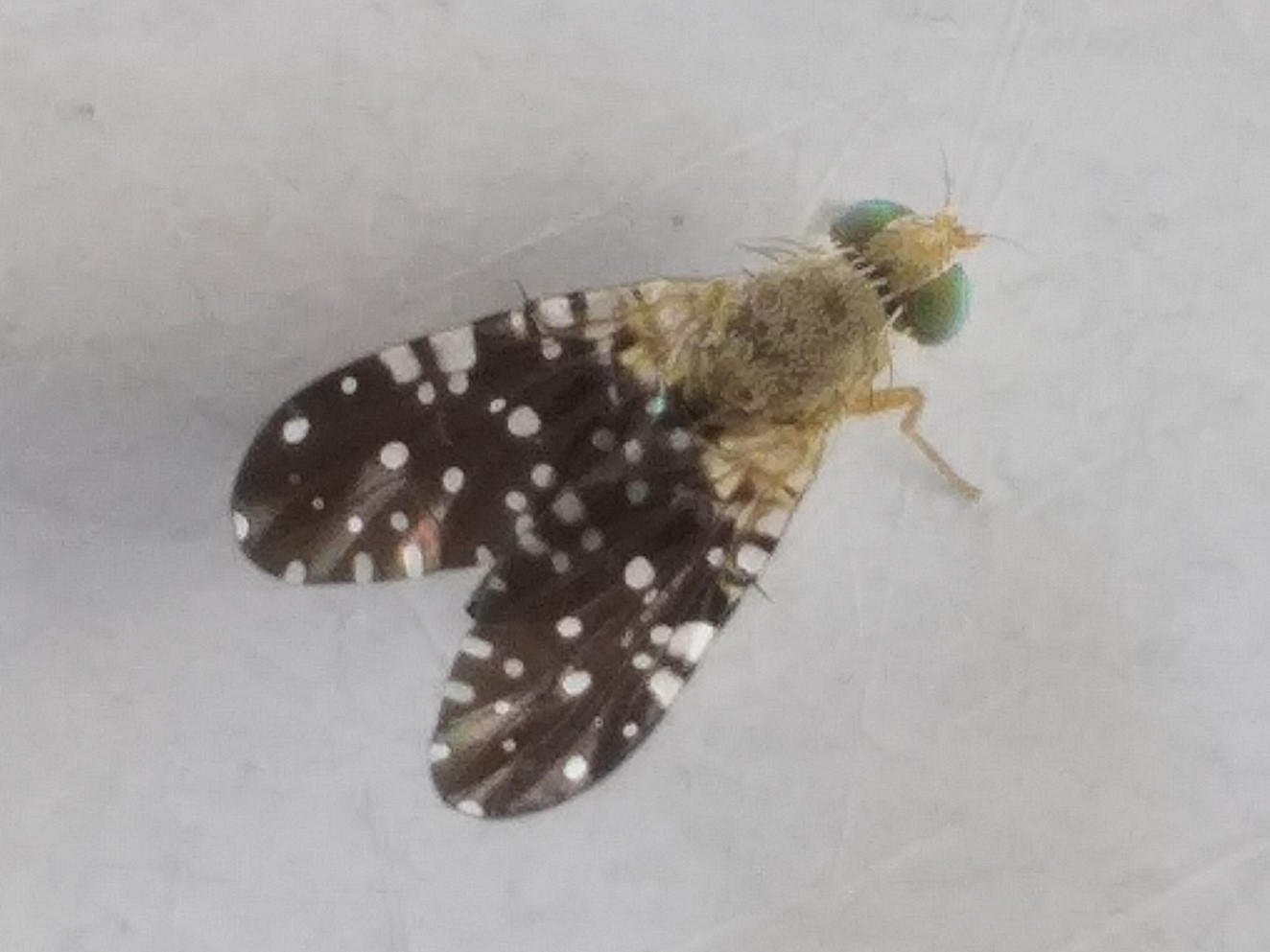

Scientific classification
- Kingdom: Animalia
- Phylum: Arthropoda
- Class: Insecta
- Order: Diptera
- Family: Tephritidae
- Subfamily: Tephritinae
- Tribe: Tephrellini
- Genus: Bezzina
- Species: B. margaritifera

Binomial name
- Bezzina margaritifera Bezzi, 1908

Synonyms
- Spathulina munroi var. majuscula Bezzi, 1924; Spathulina munroi Bezzi, 1924

= Bezzina margaritifera =

Species of fly

Bezzina margaritifera is a species of tephritid or fruit flies in the family Tephritidae.

It is found in Eritrea, East Africa, Zimbabwe, and South Africa.
