= Tephritis volkovitshi =

Scientific classification
- Kingdom: Animalia
- Phylum: Arthropoda
- Class: Insecta
- Order: Diptera
- Family: Tephritidae
- Subfamily: Tephritinae
- Tribe: Tephritini
- Genus: Tephritis
- Species: T. volkovitshi

Binomial name
- Tephritis volkovitshi (Richter, 1995)

Synonyms
- Pangasella volkovitshi Richter, 1995; Pangasella volkovitschi Richter, 1995

Species of fly

Tephritis volkovitshi is a species of tephritid or fruit flies in the genus Tephritis of the family Tephritidae.

It is found in Tajikistan.
