= Pangasella =

Scientific classification
- Kingdom: Animalia
- Phylum: Arthropoda
- Class: Insecta
- Order: Diptera
- Family: Tephritidae
- Subfamily: Tephritinae
- Tribe: Tephritini
- Genus: Pangasella; Richter, 1995

Type species
- Pangasella volkovitshi Richter, 1995

Genus of flies

Pangasella is a genus of tephritid or fruit flies in the family Tephritidae.

== Species ==
- Pangasella volkovitshi Richter, 1995
