= Tephritites =

Scientific classification
- Kingdom: Animalia
- Phylum: Arthropoda
- Class: Insecta
- Order: Diptera
- Family: Tephritidae
- Subfamily: Tephritinae
- Genus: Tephritites; Freidberg, 1979

Genus of flies

Tephritites is a genus of tephritid or fruit flies in the family Tephritidae. It may be a synonym of Hyalotephritis.
