= Insizwa =

Scientific classification
- Kingdom: Animalia
- Phylum: Arthropoda
- Class: Insecta
- Order: Diptera
- Family: Tephritidae
- Subfamily: Tephritinae
- Tribe: Tephritini
- Genus: Hyalotephritis; Munro, 1929

Type species
- Euaresta oblita Munro, 1929

Genus of flies

Insizwa is a genus of tephritid or fruit flies in the family Tephritidae.

== Species ==
- Insizwa oblita (Munro, 1929)
