= Euthauma =

Scientific classification
- Kingdom: Animalia
- Phylum: Arthropoda
- Class: Insecta
- Order: Diptera
- Family: Tephritidae
- Subfamily: Tephritinae
- Tribe: Tephritini
- Genus: Euthauma; Munro, 1949

Type species
- Euthauma ghentianum Munro, 1949

Genus of flies

Euthauma is a genus of tephritid or fruit flies in the family Tephritidae.

== Species ==
- Euthauma ghentianum Munro, 1949
