= Soraida =

Scientific classification
- Kingdom: Animalia
- Phylum: Arthropoda
- Class: Insecta
- Order: Diptera
- Family: Tephritidae
- Subfamily: Tephritinae
- Tribe: Tephritini
- Genus: Soraida; Hering, 1941

Type species
- Soraida tenebricosa Hering, 1941

Genus of flies

Soraida is a genus of tephritid or fruit flies in the family Tephritidae.

== Species ==
- Soraida tenebricosa Hering, 1941
