= Ptosanthus =

Scientific classification
- Kingdom: Animalia
- Phylum: Arthropoda
- Class: Insecta
- Order: Diptera
- Family: Tephritidae
- Subfamily: Tephritinae
- Tribe: Tephritini
- Genus: Ptosanthus; Munro, 1957

Type species
- Trypeta helva Loew, 1861

Genus of flies

Ptosanthus is a genus of tephritid or fruit flies in the family Tephritidae.

== Species ==
- Ptosanthus aida (Hering, 1937)
- Ptosanthus helvus (Loew, 1861)
