= Homoeothrix (fly) =

Scientific classification
- Kingdom: Animalia
- Phylum: Arthropoda
- Class: Insecta
- Order: Diptera
- Family: Tephritidae
- Subfamily: Tephritinae
- Tribe: Tephritini
- Genus: Homoeothrix; Hering, 1944

Type species
- Euribia lindigi Hendel, 1914

Genus of flies

Homoeothrix is a genus of tephritid or fruit flies in the family Tephritidae.

== Species ==
- Homoeothrix lindigi (Hendel, 1914)
