= Lamproxyna =

Scientific classification
- Kingdom: Animalia
- Phylum: Arthropoda
- Class: Insecta
- Order: Diptera
- Family: Tephritidae
- Subfamily: Tephritinae
- Tribe: Tephritini
- Genus: Lamproxyna; Hendel, 1914

Type species
- Lamproxyna nitidula Hendel, 1914

Genus of flies

Lamproxyna is a genus of tephritid or fruit flies in the family Tephritidae.

== Species ==
- Lamproxyna nitidula Hendel, 1914
- Lamproxyna titschacki Hering, 1941
