= Euryphalara =

Scientific classification
- Kingdom: Animalia
- Phylum: Arthropoda
- Class: Insecta
- Order: Diptera
- Family: Tephritidae
- Subfamily: Tephritinae
- Tribe: Tephritini
- Genus: Euryphalara; Munro, 1938

Type species
- Ensina barnardi Bezzi, 1924

Genus of flies

Euryphalara is a genus of tephritid or fruit flies in the family Tephritidae.

== Species ==
- Euryphalara barnardi (Bezzi, 1924)
- Euryphalara mecistocephala (Munro, 1929)
