= Axiothauma =

Scientific classification
- Kingdom: Animalia
- Phylum: Arthropoda
- Class: Insecta
- Order: Diptera
- Family: Tephritidae
- Subfamily: Tephritinae
- Tribe: Tephritini
- Genus: Axiothauma; Munro, 1946

Type species
- Axiothauma edwardsi Munro, 1946

Genus of flies

Axiothauma is a genus of tephritid or fruit flies in the family Tephritidae.

== Species ==
- Axiothauma albinodosum Munro, 1946
- Axiothauma edwardsi Munro, 1946
- Axiothauma nigrinitens Munro, 1946
