= Quasicooronga =

Scientific classification
- Kingdom: Animalia
- Phylum: Arthropoda
- Clade: Pancrustacea
- Class: Insecta
- Order: Diptera
- Family: Tephritidae
- Subfamily: Tephritinae
- Tribe: Tephritini
- Genus: Quasicooronga; Hardy & Drew, 1996

Type species
- Quasicooronga connecta Hardy & Drew, 1996

Genus of flies

Quasicooronga is a genus of tephritid or fruit flies in the family Tephritidae.

== Species ==
- Quasicooronga connecta Hardy & Drew, 1996
- Quasicooronga disconnecta Hardy & Drew, 1996
