= Freidbergia =

Scientific classification
- Kingdom: Animalia
- Phylum: Arthropoda
- Class: Insecta
- Order: Diptera
- Family: Tephritidae
- Subfamily: Tephritinae
- Tribe: Tephritini
- Genus: Freidbergia; Merz, 1999

Type species
- Freidbergia mirabilis Merz, 1999

Genus of flies

Freidbergia is a genus of tephritid or fruit flies in the family Tephritidae.

== Species ==
- Freidbergia mirabilis Merz, 1999
