= Orthocanthoides =

Scientific classification
- Kingdom: Animalia
- Phylum: Arthropoda
- Class: Insecta
- Order: Diptera
- Family: Tephritidae
- Subfamily: Tephritinae
- Tribe: Tephritini
- Genus: Orthocanthoides; Freidberg, 1987

Type species
- Orthocanthoides aristae Freidberg, 1987

Genus of flies

Orthocanthoides is a genus of tephritid or fruit flies in the family Tephritidae.

== Species ==
- Orthocanthoides aristae Freidberg, 1987
