= Brachydesis =

Scientific classification
- Kingdom: Animalia
- Phylum: Arthropoda
- Clade: Pancrustacea
- Class: Insecta
- Order: Diptera
- Family: Tephritidae
- Subfamily: Tephritinae
- Tribe: Tephritini
- Genus: Brachydesis; Hancock, 1986

Type species
- Trypanea rivularis Bezzi, 1924

Genus of flies

Brachydesis is a genus of tephritid or fruit flies in the family Tephritidae.

== Species ==
- Brachydesis rivularis (Bezzi, 1924)
