= Phaeogramma =

Scientific classification
- Kingdom: Animalia
- Phylum: Arthropoda
- Class: Insecta
- Order: Diptera
- Family: Tephritidae
- Subfamily: Tephritinae
- Tribe: Tephritini
- Genus: Phaeogramma; Grimshaw, 1901

Type species
- Phaeogramma vittipennis Grimshaw, 1901

Genus of flies

Phaeogramma is a genus of tephritid or fruit flies in the family Tephritidae.

== Species ==
- Phaeogramma hispida Hardy, 1980
- Phaeogramma vittipennis Grimshaw, 1901
