= Antoxya =

Scientific classification
- Kingdom: Animalia
- Phylum: Arthropoda
- Class: Insecta
- Order: Diptera
- Family: Tephritidae
- Subfamily: Tephritinae
- Tribe: Tephritini
- Genus: Antoxya; Munro, 1957

Type species
- Euribia oxynoides Bezzi, 1924

Genus of flies

Antoxya is a genus of tephritid or fruit flies in the family Tephritidae.

== Species ==
- Antoxya oxynoides (Bezzi, 1924)
