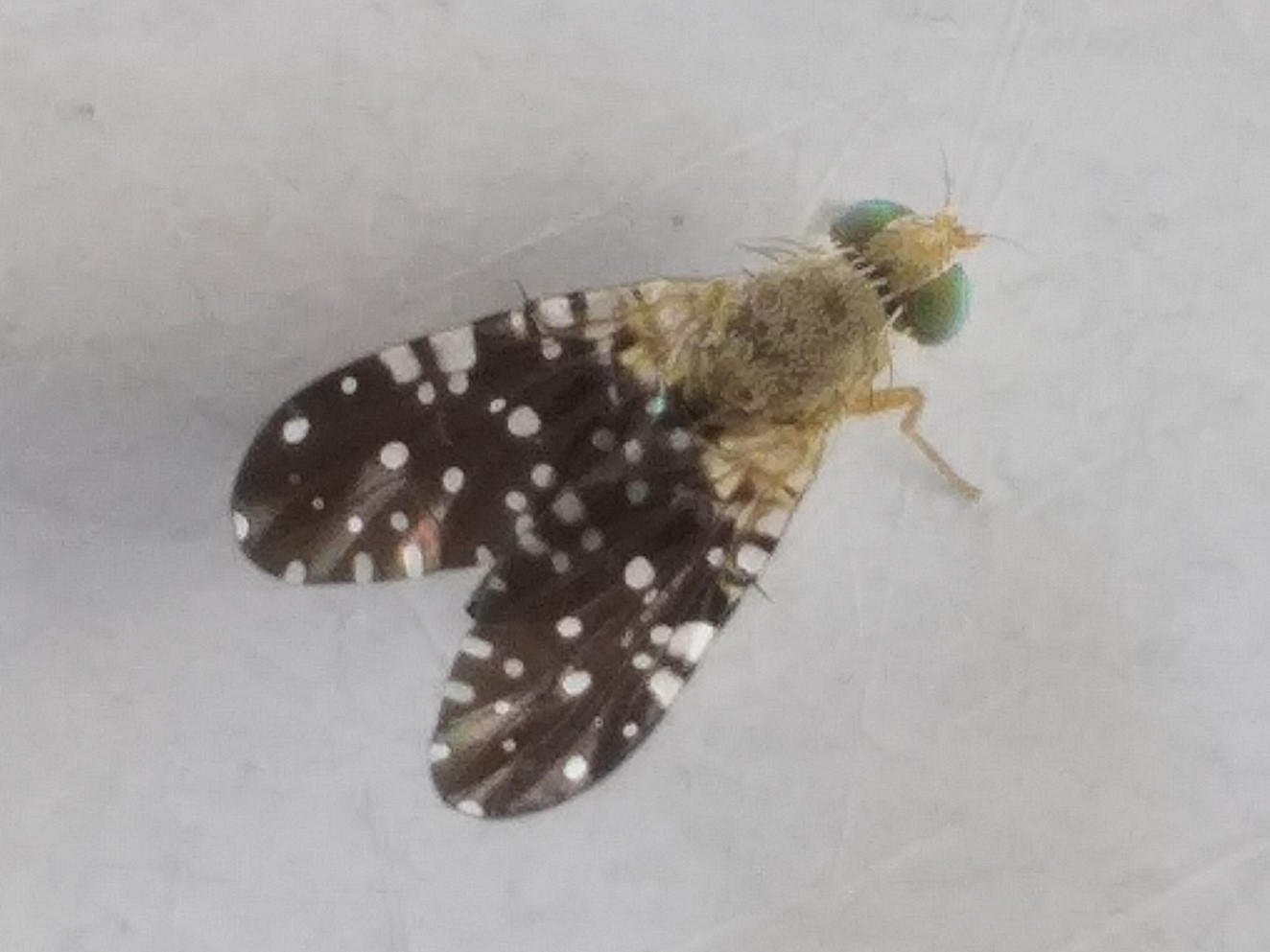
- Bezzina margaritifera

Scientific classification
- Kingdom: Animalia
- Phylum: Arthropoda
- Class: Insecta
- Order: Diptera
- Family: Tephritidae
- Subfamily: Tephritinae
- Tribe: Tephrellini
- Genus: Bezzina; Munro, 1957

Type species
- Oxyna margaritifera Bezzi, 1908

Synonyms
- Bezziella Munro, 1937

= Bezzina (fly) =

Genus of flies

Bezzina is a genus of tephritid or fruit flies in the family Tephritidae.

== Species ==
- Bezzina margaritifera (Bezzi, 1908)
- Bezzina nigrapex (Munro, 1937)
