= Cryptophorellia =

Scientific classification
- Kingdom: Animalia
- Phylum: Arthropoda
- Class: Insecta
- Order: Diptera
- Family: Tephritidae
- Subfamily: Tephritinae
- Tribe: Tephritini
- Genus: Cryptophorellia; Freidberg & Hancock, 1989

Type species
- Trypeta peringueyi Bezzi, 1924

Genus of flies

Cryptophorellia is a genus of tephritid or fruit flies in the family Tephritidae.

== Species ==
- Cryptophorellia elongatula Freidberg & Hancock, 1989
- Cryptophorellia flava Freidberg & Hancock, 1989
- Cryptophorellia longicauda Freidberg & Hancock, 1989
- Cryptophorellia madagascariensis Freidberg & Hancock, 1989
- Cryptophorellia minuta Freidberg & Hancock, 1989
- Cryptophorellia montana Freidberg & Hancock, 1989
- Cryptophorellia munroi Freidberg & Hancock, 1989
- Cryptophorellia peringueyi (Bezzi, 1924)
- Cryptophorellia phaeoptera (Bezzi, 1926)
- Cryptophorellia prairiensis Freidberg & Hancock, 1989
- Cryptophorellia stenoptera Freidberg & Hancock, 1989
- Cryptophorellia stuckenbergi Freidberg & Hancock, 1989
- Cryptophorellia tarsata Freidberg & Hancock, 1989
- Cryptophorellia trivittata Freidberg & Hancock, 1989
- Cryptophorellia vumbaensis Freidberg & Hancock, 1989
- Cryptophorellia zombaensis Freidberg & Hancock, 1989
