= Pherothrinax =

Scientific classification
- Kingdom: Animalia
- Phylum: Arthropoda
- Class: Insecta
- Order: Diptera
- Family: Tephritidae
- Subfamily: Tephritinae
- Tribe: Tephritini
- Genus: Pherothrinax; Munro, 1957

Type species
- Pherothrinax redimitis Munro, 1957

Genus of flies

Pherothrinax is a genus of tephritid or fruit flies in the family Tephritidae.

== Species ==
- Pherothrinax arrhiza (Bezzi, 1924)
- Pherothrinax bistellata (Bezzi, 1924)
- Pherothrinax furcatella (Bezzi, 1924)
- Pherothrinax lamborni (Munro, 1935)
- Pherothrinax lutescens (Bezzi, 1924)
- Pherothrinax mutila (Bezzi, 1924)
- Pherothrinax pulchella (Bezzi, 1924)
- Pherothrinax redimitis Munro, 1957
- Pherothrinax subcompleta (Bezzi, 1920)
- Pherothrinax woodi (Bezzi, 1924)
