= Migmella =

Scientific classification
- Kingdom: Animalia
- Phylum: Arthropoda
- Class: Insecta
- Order: Diptera
- Family: Tephritidae
- Subfamily: Tephritinae
- Tribe: Tephritini
- Genus: Migmella; Munro, 1957

Type species
- Trypeta planifrons Loew, 1869

Genus of flies

Migmella is a genus of tephritid or fruit flies in the family Tephritidae.

== Species ==
- Migmella amplifrons (Bezzi, 1920)
- Migmella elgonensis Munro, 1957
- Migmella planifrons (Loew, 1861)
- Migmella scotia Munro, 1957
