= Neosphaeniscus =

Scientific classification
- Kingdom: Animalia
- Phylum: Arthropoda
- Class: Insecta
- Order: Diptera
- Family: Tephritidae
- Subfamily: Tephritinae
- Tribe: Tephritini
- Genus: Neosphaeniscus; Norrbom, 2010

Type species
- Euribia m-nigrum Hendel, 1914

Genus of flies

Neosphaeniscus is a genus of tephritid or fruit flies in the family Tephritidae.

== Species ==
- Neosphaeniscus flexuosus (Bigot, 1857)
- Neosphaeniscus m-nigrum (Hendel, 1914)
