= Collessomyia =

Scientific classification
- Kingdom: Animalia
- Phylum: Arthropoda
- Clade: Pancrustacea
- Class: Insecta
- Order: Diptera
- Family: Tephritidae
- Subfamily: Tephritinae
- Tribe: Tephritini
- Genus: Collessomyia; Hardy & Drew, 1996

Type species
- Collessomyia setiger Hardy & Drew, 1996

Genus of flies

Collessomyia is a genus of tephritid or fruit flies in the family Tephritidae. They exhibit behaviors of regular fruit flies, such as feeding on plant material and laying eggs on host plants. Its found in Australia.

== Species ==
- Collessomyia setiger Hardy & Drew, 1996

== Diet ==
The diet of a Collessomyia primarily consists of plant material. Its larvae will feed on the tissue of its host plant, while adults may feed on nectar or other plant exudates.
