= Homoeotricha =

Scientific classification
- Kingdom: Animalia
- Phylum: Arthropoda
- Class: Insecta
- Order: Diptera
- Family: Tephritidae
- Subfamily: Tephritinae
- Tribe: Tephritini
- Genus: Homoeotricha; Hering, 1944

Type species
- Paroxyna arisanica Shiraki, 1933

Synonyms
- Homochromotricha Ito, 2011; Costogonia Dirlbek & Dirlbek, 1971

Genus of flies

Homoeotricha is a genus of tephritid or fruit flies in the family Tephritidae.

== Species ==
- Homoeotricha arisanica (Shiraki, 1933)
- Homoeotricha atrata (Wang, 1990)
- Homoeotricha brevicornis (Chen, 1938)
- Homoeotricha leporis Korneyev, 1993
- Homoeotricha longipennis (Shiraki, 1933)
- Homoeotricha omnistellata Ito, 2011
- Homoeotricha procusa (Dirlbek & Dirlbeková, 1971)
