= Elgonina =

Scientific classification
- Kingdom: Animalia
- Phylum: Arthropoda
- Class: Insecta
- Order: Diptera
- Family: Tephritidae
- Subfamily: Tephritinae
- Tribe: Tephritini
- Genus: Elgonina; Munro, 1957

Type species
- Elgonina refulgens Munro, 1957

Genus of flies

Elgonina is a genus of tephritid or fruit flies in the family Tephritidae.

== Species ==
- Elgonina dimorphica Freidberg & Merz, 2006
- Elgonina flavicornis Freidberg & Merz, 2006
- Elgonina fuscana Munro, 1957
- Elgonina inexpextata Freidberg & Merz, 2006
- Elgonina infuscata Freidberg & Merz, 2006
- Elgonina pollinosa Freidberg & Merz, 2006
- Elgonina refulgens Munro, 1957
- Elgonina splendida Freidberg & Merz, 2006
- Elgonina yaromi Freidberg & Merz, 2006
