= Parafreutreta =

Scientific classification
- Kingdom: Animalia
- Phylum: Arthropoda
- Class: Insecta
- Order: Diptera
- Family: Tephritidae
- Subfamily: Tephritinae
- Tribe: Tephritini
- Genus: Parafreutreta; Munro, 1929

Type species
- Camaromyia conferta Bezzi, 1926

Genus of flies

Parafreutreta is a genus of tephritid or fruit flies in the family Tephritidae.

== Species ==
- Parafreutreta bevisi (Munro, 1935)
- Parafreutreta conferta (Bezzi, 1926)
- Parafreutreta fluvialis Munro, 1940
- Parafreutreta foliata Munro, 1939
- Parafreutreta hirta Munro, 1939
- Parafreutreta leonina Munro, 1953
- Parafreutreta mavoana Munro, 1952
- Parafreutreta oriens Munro, 1940
- Parafreutreta pondoensis Munro, 1939
- Parafreutreta pretoriae Munro, 1929
- Parafreutreta producta Munro, 1957
- Parafreutreta regalis Munro, 1940
- Parafreutreta retisparsa Munro, 1939
- Parafreutreta sobrinata Munro, 1953
- Parafreutreta vumbae Hancock, 1986
