= Tephritoresta =

Scientific classification
- Kingdom: Animalia
- Phylum: Arthropoda
- Class: Insecta
- Order: Diptera
- Family: Tephritidae
- Subfamily: Tephritinae
- Tribe: Tephritini
- Genus: Tephritoresta; Hering, 1942

Type species
- Tephritoresta debilis Hering, 1942

Genus of flies

Tephritoresta is a genus of tephritid or fruit flies in the family Tephritidae.

== Species ==
- Tephritoresta debilis Hering, 1942
