= Mastigolina =

Scientific classification
- Kingdom: Animalia
- Phylum: Arthropoda
- Class: Insecta
- Order: Diptera
- Family: Tephritidae
- Subfamily: Tephritinae
- Tribe: Tephritini
- Genus: Mastigolina; Munro, 1937

Type species
- Pliomelaena bequaerti Munro, 1934

Genus of flies

Mastigolina is a genus of tephritid or fruit flies in the family Tephritidae.

== Species ==
- Mastigolina bequaerti (Munro, 1934)
- Mastigolina rufocomata Munro, 1947
