= Marriottella =

Scientific classification
- Kingdom: Animalia
- Phylum: Arthropoda
- Clade: Pancrustacea
- Class: Insecta
- Order: Diptera
- Family: Tephritidae
- Subfamily: Tephritinae
- Tribe: Tephritini
- Genus: Marriottella; Munro, 1939

Type species
- Marriottella exquisita Munro, 1939

Synonyms
- Marriotella Cogan & Munro, 1980

Genus of flies

Marriottella is a genus of tephritid fruit flies in the family Tephritidae.

== Species ==
- Marriottella exquisita Munro, 1939
- Marriottella sepsoides Freidberg & Merz, 2006
