= Acronneus =

Scientific classification
- Kingdom: Animalia
- Phylum: Arthropoda
- Class: Insecta
- Order: Diptera
- Family: Tephritidae
- Subfamily: Tephritinae
- Tribe: Tephritini
- Genus: Acronneus; Munro, 1939

Type species
- Parafreutreta bryanti Munro, 1929

Genus of flies

Acronneus is a genus of tephritid or fruit flies in the family Tephritidae.

== Species ==
Acronneus bryanti Munro, 1929
