= Trupanodesis =

Scientific classification
- Kingdom: Animalia
- Phylum: Arthropoda
- Class: Insecta
- Order: Diptera
- Family: Tephritidae
- Subfamily: Tephritinae
- Tribe: Tephritini
- Genus: Trupanodesis; Merz, 1999

Type species
- Trypanea aurea Bezzi, 1924

Genus of flies

Trupanodesis is a genus of tephritid or fruit flies in the family Tephritidae.

== Species ==
- Trupanodesis aurea (Bezzi, 1924)
