= Hyalopeza =

Scientific classification
- Kingdom: Animalia
- Phylum: Arthropoda
- Clade: Pancrustacea
- Class: Insecta
- Order: Diptera
- Family: Tephritidae
- Subfamily: Tephritinae
- Tribe: Tephritini
- Genus: Hyalopeza; Munro, 1957

Type species
- Hyalopeza schneiderae Munro, 1957

Genus of flies

Hyalopeza is a genus of tephritid or fruit flies in the family Tephritidae.

== Species ==
- Hyalopeza aristae Hancock & Drew, 2003
- Hyalopeza schneiderae Munro, 1957
