= Heringina =

Scientific classification
- Kingdom: Animalia
- Phylum: Arthropoda
- Class: Insecta
- Order: Diptera
- Family: Tephritidae
- Subfamily: Tephritinae
- Tribe: Tephritini
- Genus: Heringina; Aczél, 1940

Type species
- Tephritis guttata Fallén, 1814

Genus of flies

Heringina is a genus of tephritid or fruit flies in the family Tephritidae.

== Species ==
- Heringina guttata (Fallén, 1814)
