= Multireticula =

Scientific classification
- Kingdom: Animalia
- Phylum: Arthropoda
- Class: Insecta
- Order: Diptera
- Family: Tephritidae
- Subfamily: Tephritinae
- Tribe: Tephritini
- Genus: Multireticula; Merz, 2000

Genus of flies

Multireticula is a genus of the family Tephritidae.
