= Dectodesis =

Scientific classification
- Kingdom: Animalia
- Phylum: Arthropoda
- Class: Insecta
- Order: Diptera
- Family: Tephritidae
- Subfamily: Tephritinae
- Tribe: Tephritini
- Genus: Dectodesis; Munro, 1957

Type species
- Trypeta confluens Wiedemann, 1830

Genus of flies

Dectodesis is a genus of tephritid or fruit flies in the family Tephritidae.

== Species ==
- Dectodesis bulligera (Bezzi, 1924)
- Dectodesis bullosa (Bezzi, 1924)
- Dectodesis comis (Munro, 1954)
- Dectodesis confluens (Wiedemann, 1830)
- Dectodesis eminens (Hering, 1942)
- Dectodesis euarestina (Bezzi, 1924)
- Dectodesis katomborae Hancock, 1986
- Dectodesis luctans (Munro, 1929)
- Dectodesis monticola Munro, 1957
- Dectodesis spatiosa (Munro, 1954)
