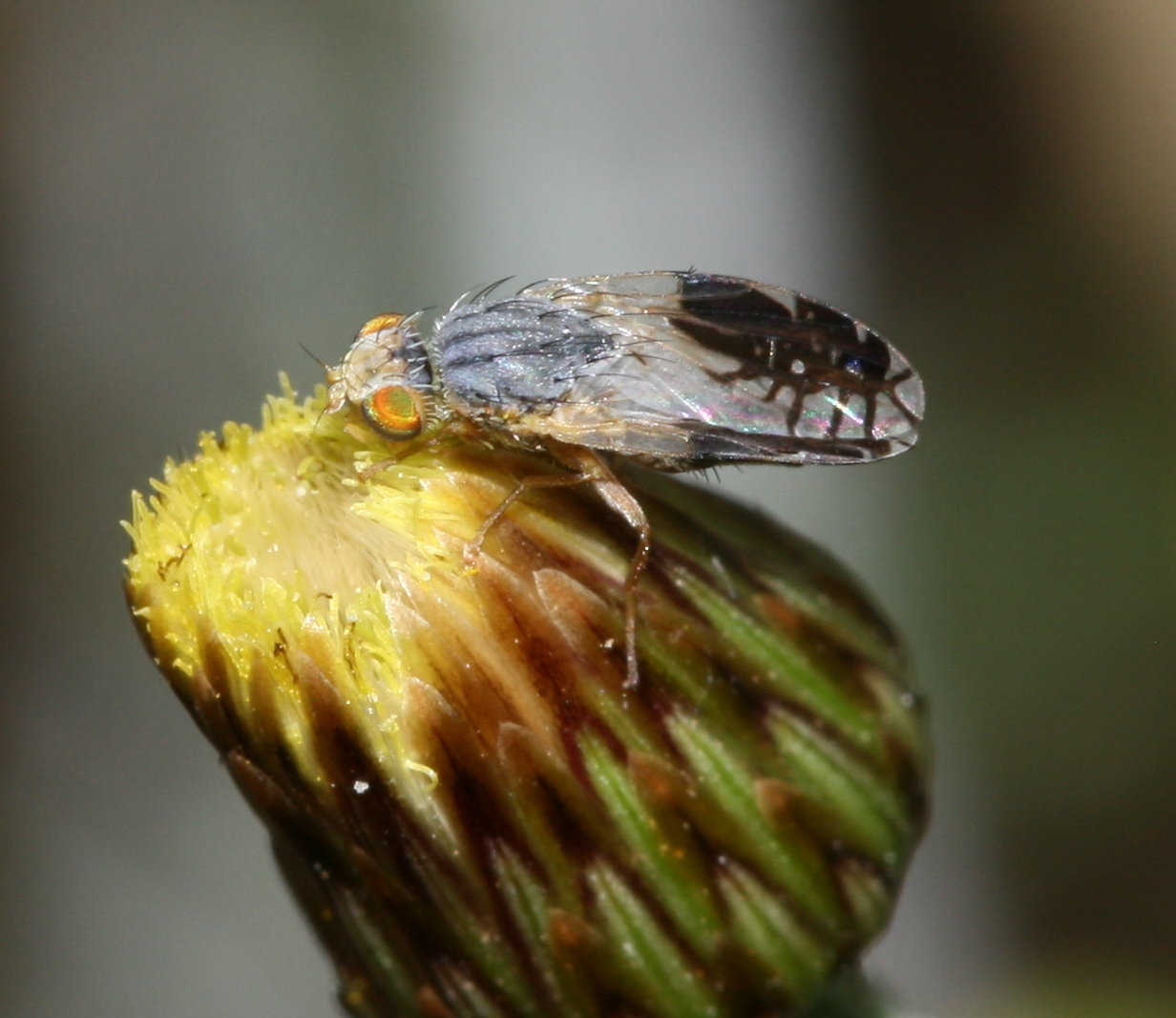
- Capitites ramulosa

Scientific classification
- Kingdom: Animalia
- Phylum: Arthropoda
- Class: Insecta
- Order: Diptera
- Family: Tephritidae
- Subfamily: Tephritinae
- Tribe: Tephritini
- Genus: Capitites; Foote & Freidberg, 1981

Type species
- Trypeta ramulosa Loew, 1844

= Capitites =

Genus of flies

Capitites is a genus of tephritid or fruit flies in the family Tephritidae.

== Species ==
- Capitites albicans (Munro, 1935)
- Capitites aurea (Bezzi, 1924)
- Capitites dentiens (Bezzi, 1924)
- Capitites dicomala (Munro, 1935)
- Capitites goliath (Bezzi, 1924)
- Capitites kloofensis (Munro, 1935)
- Capitites ramulosa (Loew, 1844)
