= Brachytrupanea =

Scientific classification
- Kingdom: Animalia
- Phylum: Arthropoda
- Clade: Pancrustacea
- Class: Insecta
- Order: Diptera
- Family: Tephritidae
- Subfamily: Tephritinae
- Tribe: Tephritini
- Genus: Brachytrupanea; Hancock, 1986

Type species
- Trypanea brachystigma Bezzi, 1924

Genus of flies

Brachytrupanea is a genus of tephritid or fruit flies in the family Tephritidae.

== Species ==
- Brachytrupanea brachystigma (Bezzi, 1924)
- Brachytrupanea semiatrata (Hering, 1942)
