= Deroparia =

Scientific classification
- Kingdom: Animalia
- Phylum: Arthropoda
- Class: Insecta
- Order: Diptera
- Family: Tephritidae
- Subfamily: Tephritinae
- Tribe: Tephritini
- Genus: Deroparia; Munro, 1957

Type species
- Ensina reticulata Munro, 1929)

Genus of flies

Deroparia is a genus of tephritid or fruit flies in the family Tephritidae.

== Species ==
- Deroparia reticulata (Munro, 1929)
