= Paraspathulina =

Scientific classification
- Kingdom: Animalia
- Phylum: Arthropoda
- Clade: Pancrustacea
- Class: Insecta
- Order: Diptera
- Family: Tephritidae
- Subfamily: Tephritinae
- Tribe: Tephritini
- Genus: Paraspathulina; Hardy & Drew, 1996

Type species
- Paraspathulina apicomacula Hardy & Drew, 1996

Genus of flies

Paraspathulina is a genus of tephritid or fruit flies in the family Tephritidae.

== Species ==
- Paraspathulina apicomacula Hardy & Drew, 1996
- Paraspathulina eremostigma Hardy & Drew, 1996
- Paraspathulina trimacula Hancock & Drew, 2003
