= Stelladesis =

Scientific classification
- Kingdom: Animalia
- Phylum: Arthropoda
- Class: Insecta
- Order: Diptera
- Family: Tephritidae
- Subfamily: Tephritinae
- Tribe: Tephritini
- Genus: Stelladesis; Merz, 1999

Type species
- Trypanea woodi Bezzi, 1924

Genus of flies

Stelladesis is a genus of tephritid or fruit flies in the family Tephritidae.

== Species ==
- Stelladesis woodi (Bezzi, 1924)
