= Rhithrum =

Scientific classification
- Kingdom: Animalia
- Phylum: Arthropoda
- Class: Insecta
- Order: Diptera
- Family: Tephritidae
- Subfamily: Tephritinae
- Genus: Rhithrum; Hendel, 1914

Genus of flies

Rhithrum is a genus of tephritid or fruit flies in the family Tephritidae.
