= Oxyparna =

Scientific classification
- Kingdom: Animalia
- Phylum: Arthropoda
- Class: Insecta
- Order: Diptera
- Family: Tephritidae
- Subfamily: Tephritinae
- Tribe: Tephritini
- Genus: Oxyparna; Korneyev, 1990

Type species
- Oxyna diluta Becker, 1908

Genus of flies

Oxyparna is a genus of tephritid or fruit flies in the family Tephritidae.

== Species ==
- Oxyparna diluta (Becker, 1908)
- Oxyparna melanostigmata Korneyev, 1990
