= Cooronga =

Scientific classification
- Kingdom: Animalia
- Phylum: Arthropoda
- Class: Insecta
- Order: Diptera
- Family: Tephritidae
- Subfamily: Tephritinae
- Tribe: Tephritini
- Genus: Cooronga; Hardy & Drew, 1996

Type species
- Cooronga mcalpinei Hardy & Drew, 1996

Genus of flies

Cooronga is a genus of tephritid or fruit flies in the family Tephritidae.

== Species ==
- Cooronga mcalpinei Hardy & Drew, 1996
