= Gymnosagena =

Scientific classification
- Kingdom: Animalia
- Phylum: Arthropoda
- Class: Insecta
- Order: Diptera
- Family: Tephritidae
- Subfamily: Tephritinae
- Tribe: Tephritini
- Genus: Gymnosagena; Munro, 1935

Type species
- Gymnosagena unicornuta Munro, 1935

Genus of flies

Gymnosagena is a genus of tephritid or fruit flies in the family Tephritidae.

== Species ==
- Gymnosagena campiglossina Freidberg & Merz, 2006
- Gymnosagena kakamega Freidberg & Merz, 2006
- Gymnosagena longicauda Freidberg & Merz, 2006
- Gymnosagena nyikaensis Freidberg & Merz, 2006
- Gymnosagena unicornuta Munro, 1935
