= Lethyna =

Scientific classification
- Kingdom: Animalia
- Phylum: Arthropoda
- Class: Insecta
- Order: Diptera
- Family: Tephritidae
- Subfamily: Tephritinae
- Tribe: Tephritini
- Genus: Lethyna; Munro, 1957

Type species
- Ensina gladiatrix Bezzi, 1920

Genus of flies

Lethyna is a genus of tephritid or fruit flies in the family Tephritidae.

== Species ==
- Lethyna aequabilis Munro, 1957
- Lethyna blaesa Munro, 1957
- Lethyna evanida (Bezzi, 1924)
- Lethyna gladiatrix (Bezzi, 1920)
- Lethyna liliputiana (Bezzi, 1924)
- Lethyna nexilis Munro, 1957
- Lethyna permodica Munro, 1957
