= Mimosophira =

Scientific classification
- Kingdom: Animalia
- Phylum: Arthropoda
- Class: Insecta
- Order: Diptera
- Family: Tephritidae
- Subfamily: Tephritinae
- Genus: Mimosophira; Hardy, 1973

Genus of flies

Mimosophira is a genus of tephritid or fruit flies in the family Tephritidae.
