= Paraactinoptera =

Scientific classification
- Kingdom: Animalia
- Phylum: Arthropoda
- Clade: Pancrustacea
- Class: Insecta
- Order: Diptera
- Family: Tephritidae
- Subfamily: Tephritinae
- Tribe: Tephritini
- Genus: Paraactinoptera; Hardy & Drew, 1996

Type species
- Paraactinoptera collessi Hardy & Drew, 1996

Genus of flies

Paraactinoptera is a genus of tephritid or fruit flies in the family Tephritidae.

== Species ==
- Paraactinoptera collessi Hardy & Drew, 1996
- Paraactinoptera danielsi Hancock & Drew, 2003
