= Oedosphenella =

Scientific classification
- Kingdom: Animalia
- Phylum: Arthropoda
- Class: Insecta
- Order: Diptera
- Family: Tephritidae
- Subfamily: Tephritinae
- Tribe: Tephritini
- Genus: Oedosphenella; Frey, 1936

Type species
- Tephritis canariensis Macquart, 1839

Genus of flies

Oedosphenella is a genus of tephritid or fruit flies in the family Tephritidae.

== Species ==
- Oedosphenella auriella (Munro, 1939)
- Oedosphenella canariensis (Macquart, 1839)
