= Telaletes =

Scientific classification
- Kingdom: Animalia
- Phylum: Arthropoda
- Class: Insecta
- Order: Diptera
- Family: Tephritidae
- Subfamily: Tephritinae
- Tribe: Tephritini
- Genus: Telaletes; Munro, 1938

Type species
- Trypeta ochracea Loew, 1861

Genus of flies

Telaletes is a genus of tephritid or fruit flies in the family Tephritidae.

== Species ==
- Telaletes obscurata Munro, 1957
- Telaletes ochracea (Loew, 1861)
