= Hyalotephritis =

Scientific classification
- Kingdom: Animalia
- Phylum: Arthropoda
- Class: Insecta
- Order: Diptera
- Family: Tephritidae
- Subfamily: Tephritinae
- Tribe: Tephritini
- Genus: Hyalotephritis; Freidberg, 1979

Type species
- Trypeta planiscutellata Becker, 1903

Genus of flies

Hyalotephritis is a genus of tephritid or fruit flies in the family Tephritidae.

== Species ==
- Hyalotephritis complanata (Munro, 1929)
- Hyalotephritis planiscutellata (Becker, 1903)
