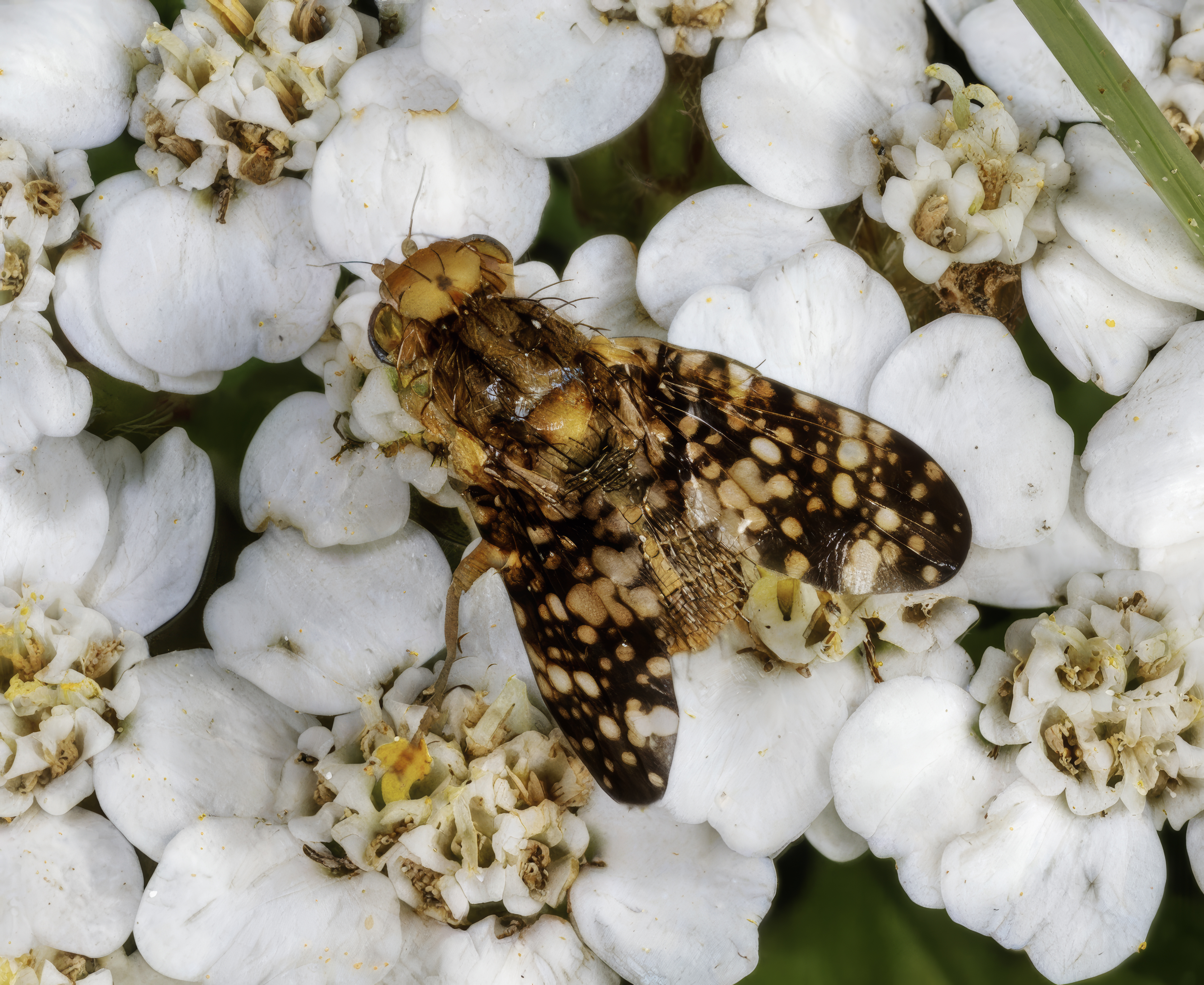
- Neotephritis finalis

Scientific classification
- Kingdom: Animalia
- Phylum: Arthropoda
- Clade: Pancrustacea
- Class: Insecta
- Order: Diptera
- Family: Tephritidae
- Subfamily: Tephritinae
- Tribe: Tephritini

= Tephritini =

Tribe of flies

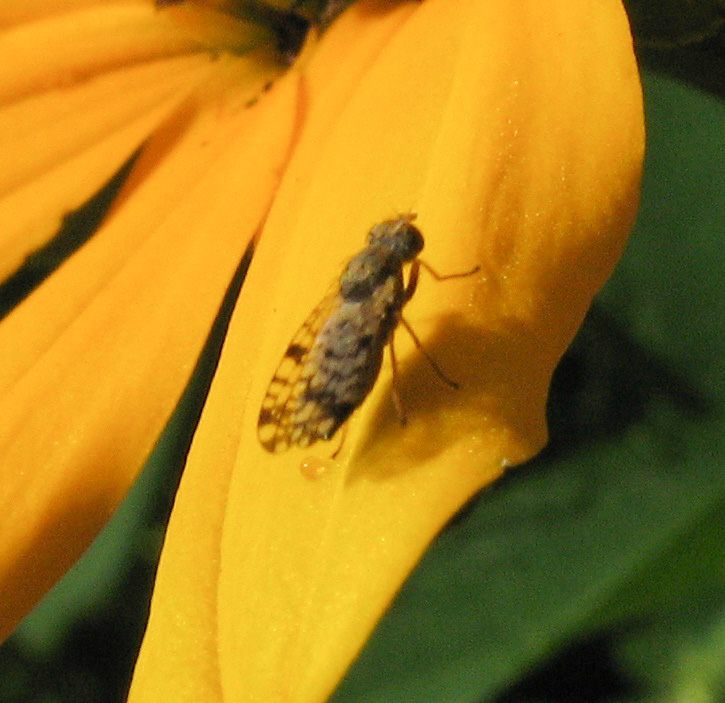
Dioxyna picciola

Tephritini is a tribe of fruit flies in the family Tephritidae. There are about 80 genera and some 1000 described species in Tephritini.

== Genera ==
- Acanthiophilus Becker, 1908
- Acronneus Munro, 1939
- Actinoptera Rondani, 1871
- Antoxya Munro, 1957
- Axiothauma Munro, 1946
- Bevismyia Munro, 1957
- Brachydesis Hancock, 1986
- Brachytrupanea Hancock, 1986
- Campiglossa Rondani, 1870
- Capitites Foote & Freidberg, 1981
- Celidosphenella Hendel, 1914
- Collessomyia Hardy & Drew, 1996
- Cooronga Hardy & Drew, 1996
- Cryptophorellia Freidberg & Hancock, 1989
- Dectodesis Munro, 1957
- Deroparia Munro, 1957
- Desmella Munro, 1957
- Dioxyna Frey, 1945
- Dyseuaresta Hendel, 1928
- Elgonina Munro, 1957
- Euaresta Loew, 1873
- Euarestella Hendel, 1927
- Euarestoides Benjamin, 1934
- Euryphalara Munro, 1938
- Euthauma Munro, 1949
- Freidbergia Merz, 1999
- Goniurellia Hendel, 1927
- Gymnosagena Munro, 1935
- Heringina Aczél, 1940
- Homoeothrix Hering, 1944
- Homoeotricha Hering, 1944
- Hyalopeza Munro, 1957
- Hyalotephritis Freidberg, 1979
- Insizwa Munro, 1929
- Lamproxyna Hendel, 1914
- Lamproxynella Hering, 1941
- Lethyna Munro, 1957
- Marriottella Munro, 1939
- Mastigolina Munro, 1937
- Mesoclanis Munro, 1938
- Migmella Munro, 1957
- Multireticula Merz, 1999
- Namwambina Munro, 1957
- Neosphaeniscus Norrbom, 2010
- Neotephritis Hendel, 1935
- Oedosphenella Frey, 1936
- Orotava Frey, 1936
- Orthocanthoides Freidberg, 1987
- Oxyna Robineau-Desvoidy, 1830
- Oxyparna Korneyev, 1990
- Pangasella Richter, 1995
- Paraactinoptera Hardy & Drew, 1996
- Parafreutreta Munro, 1929
- Parahyalopeza Hardy & Drew, 1996
- Paraspathulina Hardy & Drew, 1996
- Paratephritis Shiraki, 1933
- Peneparoxyna Hardy & Drew, 1996
- Peratomixis Munro, 1947
- Phaeogramma Grimshaw, 1901
- Pherothrinax Munro, 1957
- Plaumannimyia Hering, 1938
- Pseudoedaspis Hendel, 1914
- Ptosanthus Munro, 1957
- Quasicooronga Hardy & Drew, 1996
- Scedella Munro, 1957
- Soraida Hering, 1941
- Spathulina Rondani, 1856
- Sphenella Robineau-Desvoidy, 1830
- Stelladesis Merz, 1999
- Tanaica Munro, 1957
- Telaletes Hering, 1938
- Tephritis Latreille, 1804
- Tephritomyia Hendel, 1927
- Tephritoresta Hering, 1942
- Tephrodesis Merz, 1999
- Trupanea Schrank, 1795
- Trupanodesis Merz, 1999
- Trypanaresta Hering, 1940
- Xanthaciura Hendel, 1914
