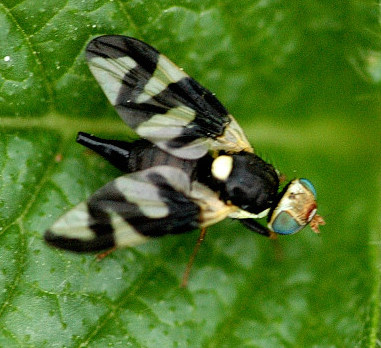
- Female Urophora cardui

Scientific classification
- Kingdom: Animalia
- Phylum: Arthropoda
- Class: Insecta
- Order: Diptera
- Family: Tephritidae
- Subfamily: Tephritinae

Genera
- See text

Diversity
- 211 genera, ca. 1860 species

Synonyms
- Myopitinae; Urophorinae

= Tephritinae =

Subfamily of flies

The Tephritinae are a subfamily of tephritid fruit flies.

== Systematics ==
The Tephritinae are grouped into 11 tribes:

- Acrotaeniini: 99 species, 10 genera:

Acrotaenia, Acrotaeniacantha, Acrotaeniostola, Baryplegma, Caenoriata, Euarestopsis, Neotaracia, Polionota, Pseudopolionota, Tetreuaresta and Tomoplagia.

- Cecidocharini: 41 species, 8 genera:

Cecidocharella, Cecidochares, Hetschkomyia, Neorhagoletis, Ostracocoelia, Procecidochares, Procecidocharoides and Pyrgotoides.

- Dithrycini: 103 species, 12 genera:

Dithryca, Aciurina, Eurosta, Valentibulla, Liepana, Oedaspis, Oedoncus, Peronyma, Ptiloedaspis, Xenodorella, Hendrella and Placaciura.

- Eutretini: 96 species, 16 genera:

Afreutreta, Cosmetothrix, Cryptotreta, Dictyotrypeta, Dracontomyia, Eutreta (subgenera Eutreta, Metatephritis and Setosigena), Laksyetsa, Merzomyia, Paracantha, Polymorphomyia, Pseudeutreta, Rachiptera, Stenopa, Strobelia, Tarchonanthea and Xanthomyia.

- Myopitini: 132 species, 11 genera:

Asimoneura, Eurasimona, Goedenia, Inuromaesa, Myopites, Myopitora, Neomyopites, Rhynencina, Spinicosta, Stamnophora and Urophora.

- Noeetini: 21 species, 7 genera:

Acidogona, Ensina, Hypenidium, Jamesomyia, Noeeta, Paracanthella and Trigonochorium.

- Schistopterini: 55 species, 10 genera:

Bactropota, Brachiopterna, Clematochaeta, Cordylopteryx, Eutretosoma, Heringomyia, Pararhabdochaeta, Rhabdochaeta, Rhochmopterum and Schistopterum.

- Tephrellini: 178 species, 38 genera:

Aciura, Afraciura, Bezzina (jun syn: Bezziella), Brachyaciura, Chipingomyia, Curticella, Dicheniotes, Dorycricus, Elaphromyia, Ghentia, Gymnaciura, Katonaia, Malagaciura, Malaisinia, Manicomyia, Metasphenisca, Munroella, Namibiocesa, Ocnerioxyna, Oxyaciura, Paraciura, Paraspheniscoides, Pediapelta, Perirhithrum, Platensina, Platomma, Pliomelaena, Psednometopum, Pseudafreutreta, Pterope, Sphaeniscus, Stephanotrypeta, Sundaresta, Tephraciura, Tephrelalis, Tephrella, Triandomelaena and Ypsilomena.

- Tephritini: 976 species, 80 genera:

Acanthiophilus, Acronneus, Actinoptera, Allocraspeda, Antoxya, Axiothauma, Bevismyia, Brachydesis, Brachytrupanea, Campiglossa, Capitites, Celidosphenella, Collessomyia, Cooronga, Cryptophorellia, Dectodesis, Deroparia, Desmella, Dioxyna, Donara, Dyseuaresta, Elgonina, Euaresta, Euarestella, Euarestoides, Euryphalara, Euthauma, Freidbergia, Goniurellia, Gymnosagena, Heringina, Homoeothrix, Homoeotricha, Hyalopeza, Hyalotephritis (syn: Tephritites), Insizwa, Lamproxyna, Lamproxynella, Lethyna, Marriottella, Mastigolina, Mesoclanis, Migmella, Multireticula, Namwambina, Neosphaeniscus, Neotephritis, Oedosphenella, Orotava, Orthocanthoides, Oxyna, Oxyparna, Pangasella, Paraactinoptera, Parafreutreta, Parahyalopeza, Paraspathulina, Paratephritis, Peneparoxyna, Peratomixis, Phaeogramma, Pherothrinax, Plaumannimyia, Pseudoedaspis, Ptosanthus, Quasicooronga, Scedella, Soraida, Spathulina, Sphenella, Stelladesis, Tanaica, Telaletes, Tephritis, Tephritomyia, Tephritoresta, Tephrodesis, Trupanea, Trupanodesis, Trypanaresta and Xanthaciura.

- Terelliini: 104 species, 6 genera:

Chaetorellia, Chaetostomella, Craspedoxantha, Neaspilota (subgenera Footerellia, Neaspilota and Neorellia), Orellia and Terellia (subgenera Cerajocera and Terellia).

- Xyphosiini: 29 species, 5 genera:

Epochrinopsis, Gymnocarena, Icterica, Ictericodes and Xyphosia.

25 species in four genera are not included in any of the above tribes. These incertae sedis genera are:

Acinia, Lilloaciura, Rhithrum and Tanaodema.

Other genera include:

Chejuparia, Mimosophira,
