= List of dipterans of Sri Lanka =

Sri Lanka is a tropical island situated close to the southern tip of India. The invertebrate fauna is as large as it is common to other regions of the world. There are about 2 million species of arthropods found in the world, and more are still being discovered to this day. This makes it very complicated and difficult to summarize the exact number of species found within a certain region.

This is a list of the dipterans found from Sri Lanka.

== Fly ==
Phylum: Arthropoda
Class: Insecta
Order: Diptera

Diptera is a large order containing an estimated 1,000,000 species of mosquitoes, horseflies, (Note: Some authors draw a distinction in writing the common names of insects. True flies are in their view best written as two words, such as crane fly, robber fly, bee fly, moth fly, and fruit fly.)

Mosquitoes (Culicidae) are vectors for malaria, dengue, West Nile virus, yellow fever, encephalitis, and other infectious diseases. Houseflies spread food-borne illnesses. Larger flies such as tsetse fly and screwworm cause significant economic harm to cattle. Well over 3,500 species of mosquitoes were found and described, and new species are about to discover. Sri Lanka is home to 131 species of mosquitoes that included to 16 genera with 17 endemic species.

Blowfly larvae, known as gentles, and other dipteran larvae, known more generally as maggots, are used as fishing bait and as food for carnivorous animals. In medical debridement, wounds are cleaned using maggots.

The exact number of species confined to the country is very difficult to note down, due to few researchers and publications of papers focusing them. Most of the cited references are from way back in 1900s, and very few are from 2010 revisions. In 2020, two stalk-eyed flies were described from Pundaluoya and Udawattakele.

There are more than 1,341 dipterans found in the island, which earns fourth largest insect order found.

=== Family: Acroceridae - Spider flies ===
- Astomella jardinei
- Lasia spinosa
- Ogcodes angustimarginatus
- Ogcodes rufomarginatus
- Pialea jardinei

=== Family: Agromyzidae - Leaf-miner flies ===
- Agromyza ceylonensis
- Agromyza solita
- Amauromyza flavida
- Amauromyza meridionalis
- Cerodontha incisa
- Cerodontha oryzivora
- Cerodontha piliseta
- Japanagromyza perplexa
- Japanagromyza tristella
- Liriomyza brassicae
- Liriomyza huidobrensis
- Liriomyza pusilla
- Liriomyza sativae
- Melanagromyza albisquama
- Melanagromyza atomella
- Melanagromyza cleomae
- Melanagromyza hibisci
- Melanagromyza obtusa
- Melanagromyza pubiseta
- Melanagromyza rotata
- Melanagromyza sojae
- Ophiomyia aberrans
- Ophiomyia atralis
- Ophiomyia conspicua
- Ophiomyia lantanae
- Ophiomyia phaseoli
- Phytoliriomyza arctica
- Phytoliriomyza australensis
- Phytoliriomyza nigriantennalis
- Phytoliriomyza rangalensis
- Phytomyza ceylonensis
- Phytomyza syngenesiae
- Pseudonapomyza asiatica
- Pseudonapomyza gujaratica
- Pseudonapomyza quatei
- Tropicomyia polyphaga
- Tropicomyia theae

=== Family: Anisopodidae - Wood gnats ===
- Olbiogaster fulviventris
- Olbiogaster orientalis
- Olbiogaster zeylanicus
- Sylvicola foveatus
- Sylvicola maculipennis

=== Family: Anthomyiidae - Root-maggot flies ===
- Emmesomyia kempi

=== Family: Asilidae - Robber flies ===
- Astochia annulipes
- Astochia ceylonicus
- Astochia determinatus
- Astochia grisea
- Astochia tarsalis
- Chrysopogon nodulibarbis
- Chrysopogon serrulatus
- Chrysopogon zizanioides
- Clephydroneura annulatus
- Clephydroneura apicalis
- Clinopogon odontoferus
- Cophinopoda chinensis
- Damalis felderi
- Damalis fulvipes
- Damalis infuscata
- Damalis kassebeeri
- Dasophrys coetzeei
- Emphysomera femorata
- Emphysomera nigra
- Euscelidia flava
- Euscelidia prolata
- Euscelidia simplex
- Eutolmus ohirai
- Heligmoneura pulcher
- Heteropogon triticeus
- Laphystia stigmaticallis
- Machimus parvus
- Michotamia aurata
- Michotamia deceptus
- Microstylum rufoabdominalis
- Microstylum whitei
- Neoitamus ceylonicus
- Neoitamus pulcher
- Neoitamus tarsalis
- Neomochtherus gnavus
- Nusa yerburyi
- Pegesimallus srilankensis
- Pegesimallus yerburyi
- Philodicus ceylanicus
- Philodicus chinensis
- Philodicus hospes
- Philodicus meridionalis
- Philodicus thoracinus
- Promachus ceylanicus
- Promachus pseudomaculatus
- Promachus yerburiensis
- Saropogon maculipennis
- Saropogon srilankaensis
- Scleropogon piceus
- Stenopogon piceus
- Stenopogon variabilis

=== Family: Asteiidae - Asteiid flies ===
- Asteia pusillima

=== Family: Athericidae - Ibis flies ===
- Atherix labiate
- Suragina elegans
- Suragina labiata
- Suragina uruma

=== Family: Blephariceridae - Net-winged midges ===
- Hammatorrhina bella
- Hammatorrhina pulchra

=== Family: Bombyliidae - Bee flies ===
- Anthrax ceylonica
- Anthrax distigma
- Anthrax semifuscatus
- Bombylisoma resplendens
- Bombylius ardens
- Bombylius brunettii
- Bombylius dives
- Bombylius maculatus
- Bombylius propinquus
- Dischistus resplendens
- Euchariomyia dives
- Exoprosopa affinissima
- Exoprosopa bengalensis
- Exoprosopa brahma
- Exoprosopa flammea
- Exoprosopa ghilarovi
- Exoprosopa insulata
- Exoprosopa niveiventris
- Exoprosopa punjabensis
- Exoprosopa stylata
- Exoprosopa tursonovi
- Geron argentifrons
- Heteralonia neurospila
- Exoprosopa affinissima
- Ligyra semifuscata
- Ligyra sphinx
- Litorhina lar
- Micomitra vitripennis
- Petrorossia brunettii
- Petrorossia ceylonica
- Petrorossia intermedia
- Petrorossia talawila
- Systoechus eupogonatus
- Systoechus socius
- Systoechus srilankae
- Thyridanthrax absalon
- Thyridanthrax keiseri
- Villa approximata
- Villa fletcheri

=== Family: Bibionidae - March flies ===
- Plecia malayaensis
- Plecia mallochi
- Plecia rufilatera

=== Family: Calliphoridae - Blow flies ===
- Bengalia bezzii
- Bengalia fuscipennis
- Bengalia hastativentris
- Bengalia jejuna
- Bengalia obscuripennis
- Bengalia torosa
- Borbororhinia bivittata
- Caiusa testacea
- Chrysomya megacephala
- Chrysomya nigripes
- Chrysomya pinguis
- Chrysomya rufifacies
- Chrysomya villeneuvi
- Cosmina simplex
- Hemipyrellia ligurriens
- Idiella divisa
- Idiella euidielloides
- Idiella mandarina
- Isomyia fulvicornis
- Isomyia pseudonepalana
- Isomyia pseudoviridana
- Isomyia sinharaja
- Isomyia versicolor
- Isomyia yerburyi
- Isomyia zeylanica
- Lucilia caesia
- Lucilia obesa
- Lucilia porphyrina
- Metallea clausa
- Metallea flavibasis
- Metallea major
- Metallea notata
- Onesia danielssoni
- Onesia kamimurai
- Onesia lanka
- Phumosia indica
- Phumosia testacea
- Polleniopsis nigripalpis
- Polleniopsis zaitzevi
- Rhinia apicalis
- Rhinia melastoma
- Rhyncomya currani
- Rhyncomya divisa
- Stomorhina cincta
- Stomorhina discolor
- Stomorhina lunata
- Stomorhina nigripes
- Strongyloneura prolata
- Tainanina pilisquama
- Tainanina sarcophagoides
- Thoracites abdominalis
- Thoracites miltogrammoides

=== Family: Canacidae - Surge flies ===
- Chaetocanace brincki
- Dasyrhicnoessa fulva
- Dasyrhicnoessa vockerothi
- Horaismoptera hennigi
- Nocticanace taprobane
- Procanace grisescens
- Pseudorhicnoessa rattii
- Xanthocanace zeylanica

=== Family: Cecidomyiidae - Gall midges ===
- Androdiplosis coccidivora - monotypic endemic
- Arthrocnodax rutherfordi
- Arthrocnodax walkeriana
- Bryocrypta girafa
- Calopedila polyalthiae
- Cecidomyiidi generosi
- Cecidomyiidi hirta
- Chrysodiplosis squamatipes
- Clinodiplosis ceylonica
- Coccomyza donaldi
- Dentifibula obtusilobae
- Diadiplosis coccidivora
- Didactylomyia ceylanica
- Diplecus inconspicuus - monotypic endemic
- Endaphis hirta
- Feltiella acarisuga
- Hallomyia iris
- Lasioptera aeschynanthusperottetti
- Lestodiplosis ceylanica
- Lestremia ceylanica
- Misocosmus ceylanicus - monotypic endemic
- Mycodiplosis simulacri
- Mycodiplosis simulaeri
- Orseolia ceylanica
- Orseolia ceylonica
- Plutodiplosis maginifica
- Plutodiplosis magnifica
- Pseudoperomyia parvolobata
- Trichoperrisia pipericola - monotypic endemic
- Vanchidiplosis ceylanica
- Xylodiplosis aestivalis

=== Family: Celyphidae - Beetle flies ===
- Celyphus anisotomoides
- Celyphus hyalinus
- Celyphus obtectus
- Spaniocelyphus bigoti
- Spaniocelyphus cognatus

=== Family: Ceratopogonidae - Biting midges ===
- Alluaudomyia marginalis
- Alluaudomyia spinosipes
- Alluaudomyia xanthocoma
- Alluaudomyia bifurcata
- Alluaudomyia formosana
- Alluaudomyia fuscipes
- Alluaudomyia maculosipennis
- Atrichopogon schizonyx
- Parabezzia orientalis

=== Family: Chamaemyiidae - Silver flies ===
- Acrometopia reicherti
- Leucopis luteicornis

=== Family: Chaoboridae - Phantom midges ===
- Chaoborus asiaticus
- Corethrella inepta

=== Family: Chironomidae - Nonbiting midges ===
- Ablabesmyia annulatipes
- Cardiocladius ceylanicus
- Chironomini albiforceps
- Chironomini ceylanicus
- Chironomini striatipennis
- Chironomus allothrix
- Chironomus chlogaster
- Chironomus elatus
- Chironomus gloriosus
- Chironomus heptatomus
- Chironomus hexatomus
- Chironomus laminatus
- Chironomus perichlorus
- Chironomus pretiosus
- Chironomus sumptuosus
- Chironomus superbus
- Chironomus variicornis
- Clinotanypus ceylanicus
- Clinotanypus ornatissimus
- Clinotanypus variegatus
- Nilodorum biroi
- Nilodorum tainanus
- Orthocladiinae ceylanicus
- Polypedilum nubifer
- Tanypus pallidipes
- Tanytarsini prasiogaster
- Tanytarsini transversalis
- Tanytarsus ceylanicus
- Tanytarsus lobatus
- Tanytarsus poecilus

=== Family: Chloropidae - Eye flies ===
- Anatrichus pygmaeus
- Anthracophagella albovariegata
- Anthracophagella sulcifrons
- Arcuator horni
- Cadrema bilineata
- Cadrema colombensis
- Cadrema minor
- Cadrema ocellata
- Cestoplectus intuens
- Chlorops laevifrons
- Chlorops lutheri
- Chlorops quadrilineata
- Chlorops zeylanicus
- Chloropsina brunnescens
- Chloropsina lacreiventris
- Conioscinella humeralis
- Dactylothyrea hyalipennis
- Dactylothyrea spinipes
- Elachiptera indistincta
- Ensiferella ceylonica
- Ensiferella obscurella
- Eutropha flavomaculata
- Eutropha siphloidea
- Gampsocera grandis
- Gampsocera mutata
- Lasiopleura fulvitarsis
- Lasiopleura zeylanica
- Meijerella inaequalis
- Merochlorops ceylanicus
- Myrmecosepsis taprobane
- Pachylophus rufescens
- Parectecephala indica
- Polyodaspis flavipila
- Polyodaspis ruficornis
- Pseudeurina maculata
- Rhodesiella ceylonica
- Rhodesiella foveata
- Rhodesiella nana
- Rhodesiella planiscutellata
- Rhodesiella sanctijohani
- Rhodesiella sauteri
- Rhodesiella scutellata
- Rhodesiella tibiella
- Scoliophthalmus micans
- Semaranga dorsocentralis
- Sepsidoscinis maculipennis
- Siphlus vittatus
- Siphonellopsina kokagalensis
- Siphunculina funicola
- Siphunculina intonsa
- Thaumatomyia semicolon

=== Family: Clusiidae - Druid flies ===
- Czernyola sasakawai
- Phylloclusia lanceola

=== Family: Conopidae - Thick-headed flies ===
- Conops ceylonicus
- Conops keiseri
- Conops nubeculosus
- Physocephala aurantiaca
- Physocephala diffusa
- Physocephala limbipennis
- Physocephala tenella
- Pleurocerinella dioctriaeformis
- Pleurocerinella srilankai
- Stylogaster orientalis

=== Family: Cryptochetidae ===
- Cryptochetum curtipenne

=== Family: Cypselosomatidae ===
- Formicosepsis brincki

=== Family: Curtonotidae - Quasimodo flies ===
- Axinota sarawakensis
- Axinota simulans
- Curtonotum ceylonense

=== Family: Diopsidae - Stalk-eyed flies ===
- Pseudodiopsis bipunctipennis
- Teleopsis ferruginea
- Teleopsis krombeini
- Teleopsis maculata
- Teleopsis neglecta
- Teleopsis rubicunda
- Teleopsis sorora

=== Family: Dixidae - Meniscus midges ===
- Dixa zeylanica

=== Family: Dolichopodidae - Long-legged flies ===
- Amblypsilopus bruneli
- Amblypsilopus munroi
- Argyrochlamys impudicus
- Campsicnemus crossotibia
- Chrysosoma annotatum
- Chrysosoma appendiculatum
- Chrysosoma armillatum
- Chrysosoma congruens
- Chrysosoma cupido
- Chrysosoma derisior
- Chrysosoma duplicatum
- Chrysosoma excisum
- Chrysosoma extractum
- Chrysosoma fasciatum
- Chrysosoma infirme
- Chrysosoma kandyensis
- Chrysosoma ovale
- Chrysosoma palapes
- Chrysosoma pallidum
- Chrysosoma petulans
- Chrysosoma pulcherrimum
- Chrysosoma pusilum
- Chrysosoma shentorea
- Chrysosoma vittatum
- Chrysotus degener
- Condylostylus impar
- Condylostylus lutheri
- Condylostylus setifer
- Diaphorus detectus
- Diaphorus maurus
- Diaphorus nigerrimus
- Diaphorus rostratus
- Diaphorus simulans
- Diaphorus vagans
- Dolichopodinae torquata
- Dolichopus hirsutisetis
- Hydrophorus geminus
- Lichtwardtia ziczac
- Medetera austroapicalis
- Medetera chandleri
- Medetera grisecens
- Megistostylus longicornis
- Mesorhaga breviapendiculata
- Mesorhaga breviappendiculata
- Mesorhaga mellavana
- Mesorhaga nigrobarbata
- Mesorhaga nigroviridis
- Mesorhaga obscura
- Mesorhaga pseudolata
- Mesorhaga terminalis
- Neurigona denudata
- Neurigona exemta
- Paraclius adligatus
- Paraclius albimanus
- Paraclius callosus
- Paraclius luculentus
- Paraclius maritimus
- Paraclius paraguayensis
- Paraclius trisetosus
- Paraclius viridus
- Pelastoneurus aequalis
- Pelastoneurus crassinervis
- Pelastoneurus potomacus
- Plagiozopelma santense
- Sciapus aequalis
- Sciapus rectus
- Sciapus viridicollis
- Sympycnus albipes
- Sympycnus maculatus
- Sympycnus strenuus
- Sympycnus turbidus
- Syntormon edwardsi
- Tachytrechus tessellatus
- Urodolichus keiseri

=== Family: Drosophilidae - Fruit flies ===
- Amiota magna
- Amiota subradiata
- Cacoxenus asiatica
- Colocasiomyia minor
- Colocasiomyia nigripennis
- Colocasiomyia zeylanica
- Chymomyza rufithorax
- Chymomyza pararufithorax
- Chymomyza flagellata
- Chymomyza formosana
- Chymomyza brevis
- Chymomyza cinctifrons
- Chymomyza cirricauda
- Chymomyza constricta
- Chymomyza cyanea
- Crincosia gugorum
- Dettopsomyia formosa
- Dettopsomyia jacobsoni
- Dettopsomyia preciosa
- Dettopsomyia zeylanica
- Diathoneura preciosa
- Dichaetophora cirricauda
- Dichaetophora constricta
- Dichaetophora cyanea
- Dichaetophora fascifrons
- Dichaetophora nigrifrons
- Dichaetophora paraserrata
- Dichaetophora quadrifrons
- Drosophila melanogaster
- Drosophila chandleri
- Hirtodrosophila chandleri
- Hirtodrosophila seminigra
- Hirtodrosophila trivittata
- Hypselothyrea varanasiensis
- Laccodrosophila atra
- Leucophenga abbreviata
- Leucophenga acutipollinosa
- Leucophenga albofasciata
- Leucophenga angusta
- Leucophenga argentata
- Leucophenga atrinervis
- Leucophenga bellula
- Leucophenga digmasoma
- Leucophenga flavicosta
- Leucophenga interrupta
- Leucophenga jacobsoni
- Leucophenga limbipennis
- Leucophenga lynettae
- Leucophenga maculata
- Leucophenga meijerei
- Leucophenga nigripalpis
- Leucophenga nigroscutellata
- Leucophenga pectinata
- Leucophenga quadripunctata
- Leucophenga setipalpis
- Leucophenga subpollinosa
- Leucophenga umbratula
- Liodrosophila actinia
- Liodrosophila ceylonica
- Liodrosophila crescens
- Liodrosophila globosa
- Liodrosophila ornata
- Liodrosophila varians
- Lissocephala metallescens
- Lordiphosa nigrostyla
- Lordiphosa spinopenicula
- Microdrosophila bullata
- Microdrosophila conica
- Microdrosophila elongata
- Microdrosophila filamentea
- Microdrosophila furcata
- Microdrosophila macroctenia
- Microdrosophila matsudairai
- Microdrosophila nigrispina
- Microdrosophila pleurolineata
- Microdrosophila sarawakana
- Microdrosophila tectifrons
- Mulgravea asiatica
- Mulgravea vittata
- Mycodrosophila alienata
- Mycodrosophila amabilis
- Mycodrosophila aqua
- Mycodrosophila ciliophora
- Mycodrosophila gordoni
- Mycodrosophila gratiosa
- Mycodrosophila parallelinervis
- Paramycodrosophila pictula
- Pararhinoleucophenga maura
- Phortica foliiseta
- Phortica xyleboriphaga
- Phorticella bistriata
- Scaptodrosophila anderssoni
- Scaptodrosophila brincki
- Scaptodrosophila cederholmi
- Scaptodrosophila coniura
- Scaptodrosophila excavata
- Scaptodrosophila nigrescens
- Scaptodrosophila subminima
- Scaptomyza bipars
- Scaptomyza brachycerca
- Scaptomyza clavifera
- Scaptomyza devexa
- Scaptomyza elmoi
- Scaptomyza salvadorae
- Sphaerogastrella javana
- Stegana castanea
- Stegana lateralis
- Stegana nigrifrons
- Stegana subconvergens
- Tambourella sphaerogaster
- Zaprionus sepsoides
- Zapriothrica hirta
- Zapriothrica nudiseta
- Zygothrica flavociliata
- Zygothrica fuscina
- Zygothrica vittinubila

=== Family: Empididae - Balloon flies ===
- Empis carbonaria
- Empis ceylonica
- Hilarempis neptunus
- Wiedemannia submarina

=== Family: Ephydridae - Shore flies ===
- Actocetor nigrifinis
- Ceropsilopa cupreiventris
- Ceropsilopa decussata
- Chlorichaeta orba
- Chlorichaeta tuberculosa
- Clasiopella uncinata
- Discocerina obscurella
- Discomyza maculipennis
- Dryxo brahma
- Dryxo lispoidea
- Hecamede granifera
- Hecamedoides hepatica
- Hydrellia griseola
- Hydrellia latipalpis
- Lamproclasiopa biseta
- Leptopsilopa pollinosa
- Notiphila bipunctata
- Notiphila dorsopunctata
- Notiphila indistincta
- Notiphila philippinensis
- Notiphila puberula
- Notiphila puncta
- Notiphila simalurensis
- Rhynchopsilopa ceylonensis
- Paralimna hirticornis
- Paralimna javana
- Paralimna lineata
- Paralimna picta
- Paralimna quadrifascia
- Placopsidella phaeonota
- Polytrichophora brunneifrons
- Psilopa flavimanus
- Rhynchopsilopa ceylonensis

=== Family: Fanniidae - Little house flies ===
- Euryomma peregrinum
- Fannia canicularis

=== Family: Hippoboscidae - Louse flies ===
- Ascodipteron emballonurae
- Brachytarsina cucullata
- Brachytarsina modesta
- Brachytarsina pygialis
- Brachytarsina speiseri
- Hippobosca longipennis
- Hippobosca variegata
- Lipoptena axis
- Lipoptena efovea
- Lynchia corvina
- Lynchia longipalpis
- Myophthiria reduvioides
- Myophthiria zeylanica
- Ornithoctona plicata
- Ornithoica curvata
- Raymondia pagodarum

=== Family: Hybotidae - Dance flies ===
- Bicellaria bisetosa
- Drapetis abdominenotata
- Drapetis basalis
- Drapetis distincta
- Drapetis fulvithorax
- Drapetis metatarsata
- Drapetis nigropunctata
- Drapetis notatithorax
- Drapetis plumicornis
- Elaphropeza distincta
- Elaphropeza pollicata
- Hybos apicis
- Hybos bistosus
- Hybos geniculatus
- Parahybos luteicornis
- Parahybos maculithorax
- Platypalpus ceylonensis
- Platypalpus zelanica
- Stilpon divergens
- Syndyas jovis
- Syndyas parvicellulata
- Syneches bigoti
- Syneches fuscipennis
- Syneches helvolus
- Syneches immaculatus
- Syneches jardinei
- Syneches maculithorax
- Syneches minutus
- Syneches peradeniyae
- Syneches signatus
- Syneches singatus
- Syneches varipes
- Trichina ceylonica

=== Family: Lauxaniidae ===
- Cerataulina boettcheri
- Chaetolauxania sulphuriceps
- Drepanephora horrida
- Homoneura bistriata
- Homoneura crassicauda
- Homoneura curta
- Homoneura intereuns
- Homoneura leucoprosopon
- Homoneura lucida
- Homoneura ornatipennis
- Homoneura sauteri
- Homoneura spiculata
- Homoneura trypetoptera
- Homoneura yerburyi
- Pachycerina javana
- Phobeticomyia lunifera
- Poecilolycia vittata
- Steganopsis fuscipennis
- Steganopsis multilineata
- Steganopsis pupicola
- Steganopsis tripunctata
- Trigonometopus zeylanicus

=== Family: Keroplatidae - Fungus gnats ===
- Burmacrocera minuta - monotypic genus
- Heteropterna fenestralis
- Isoneuromyia annandalei
- Keroplatus notaticoxa
- Laurypta tripunctata
- Macrocera fryeri
- Orfelia bibula
- Orfelia negotiosa
- Orfelia saeva
- Orfelia ventosa
- Platyceridion edax - endemic genus
- Platyceridion talaroceroides
- Platyura fumipes
- Platyura juxta
- Platyura lunifrons
- Platyura minuta
- Platyura tripunctata
- Proceroplatus poecilopterus
- Proceroplatus pulchripennis
- Rutylapa juxta
- Srilankana mirabilis - monotypic endemic
- Truplaya fumipes
- Xenoplatyura lunifrons

=== Family: Limoniidae - Limoniid crane flies ===
- Antocha salikensis
- Baeoura pollicis
- Baeoura taprobanes
- Baeoura triquetra
- Conosia irrorata
- Conosia minuscula
- Dicranomyia guttula
- Dicranomyia ravana
- Dicranomyia rectidens
- Dicranomyia saltens
- Dicranomyia sielediva
- Dicranomyia sordida
- Dicranomyia tipulipes
- Dolichopeza flavicans
- Dolichopeza guttulanalis
- Dolichopeza palifera
- Dolichopeza singhalica
- Ellipteroides pictilis
- Ellipteroides rohuna
- Ellipteroides thiasodes
- Epiphragma kempi
- Erioptera incompleta
- Erioptera notate
- Erioptera orbitalis
- Eupilaria singhalica
- Eupilaria taprobanica
- Eupilaria thysanotos
- Geranomyia circipunctata
- Geranomyia circipunctata
- Geranomyia genitaloides
- Geranomyia gracilispinosa
- Geranomyia genitaloides
- Gonomyia conjugens
- Gonomyia hedys
- Gonomyia lanka
- Gonomyia persimilis
- Gonomyia runa
- Gonomyia serendibensis
- Gymnastes maya
- Gymnastes simhalae
- Gymnastes violaceus
- Hexatoma albonotata - subsp. citrocastanea
- Hexatoma badia
- Hexatoma crystalloptera
- Hexatoma ctenophoroides - subsp. ctenophoroides, nigrithorax
- Hexatoma fusca
- Hexatoma greenii
- Hexatoma humberti
- Hexatoma meleagris
- Hexatoma neopaenulata
- Hexatoma ochripleuris
- Hexatoma pachyrrhina
- Hexatoma pachyrrhinoides
- Hexatoma scutellata
- Hexatoma serendib
- Hexatoma subnitens
- Hexatoma tuberculifera
- Hexatoma yerburyi
- Idiocera conchiformis
- Idiocera persimilis
- Libnotes greeni
- Libnotes immaculipennis
- Libnotes notata
- Libnotes palaeta
- Libnotes poeciloptera
- Libnotes thwaitesiana
- Limonia albipes
- Limonia annulata
- Limonia ayodhya
- Limonia chaseni
- Limonia latiorflava
- Limonia longivena
- Limonia ravida
- Limonia vibhishana
- Molophilus hylandensis
- Molophilus rachius
- Molophilus veddah
- Molophilus wejaya
- Molophilus yakkho
- Orimarga asignata
- Orimarga taprobanica
- Paradelphomyia indulcata
- Paradelphomyia subterminalis
- Polymera zeylanica
- Prionota serraticornis
- Pseudolimnophila zelanica
- Rhabdomastix schmidiana
- Rhipidia subtesselata
- Styringomyia ceylonica
- Styringomyia flava
- Styringomyia fryeri
- Styringomyia marmorata
- Tasiocerellus kandyensis - endemic genus
- Teucholabis angusticapitis
- Teucholabis annuloabdominalis
- Teucholabis fenestrata
- Teucholabis ornata
- Thrypticomyia apicalis
- Toxorhina yamma
- Trentepohlia nigroapicalis
- Trentepohlia pennipes
- Trentepohlia speiseri
- Trentepohlia tenera
- Trentepohlia trentepohlii

=== Family: Lonchaeidae - Lance flies ===
- Lamprolonchaea pipinna
- Lonchaea incisurata
- Lonchaea minuta
- Silba abstata
- Silba admirabilis
- Silba excisa
- Silba perplexa
- Silba pollinosa
- Silba setifera
- Silba srilanka

=== Family: Lygistorrhinidae ===
- Lygistorrhina asiatica

=== Family: Micropezidae - Stilt-legged flies ===
- Grammicomyia ferrugata
- Grammicomyia testacea
- Mimegralla nietneri
- Mimegralla splendens

=== Family: Milichiidae - Freeloader flies ===
- Desmometopa inaurata
- Desmometopa kandyensis
- Desmometopa srilankae
- Phyllomyza aelleni

=== Family: Muscidae - House flies ===
- Atherigona atripalpis
- Atherigona bella
- Atherigona confusa
- Atherigona exigua
- Atherigona falcata
- Atherigona gamma
- Atherigona laeta
- Atherigona lamda
- Atherigona maculigera
- Atherigona naquvii
- Atherigona naqvii
- Atherigona orientalis
- Atherigona oryzae
- Atherigona pulla
- Atherigona punctata
- Atherigona reversura
- Atherigona simplex
- Caricea tinctipennis
- Cephalispa lata
- Cephalispa mira
- Cephalispa capitulata
- Dichaetomyia acrostichalis
- Dichaetomyia apicalis
- Dichaetomyia curvimedia
- Dichaetomyia fumaria
- Dichaetomyia handschini
- Dichaetomyia holoxantha
- Dichaetomyia keiseri
- Dichaetomyia manca
- Dichaetomyia melanotela
- Dichaetomyia pallidorsis
- Dichaetomyia seniorwhitei
- Dichaetomyia splendida
- Dichaetomyia tamil
- Graphomya adumbrata
- Graphomya atripes
- Graphomya rufitibia
- Gymnodia ascendens
- Gymnodia distincta
- Haematobia minuta
- Haematobosca sanguinolenta
- Hebecnema nigra
- Hebecnema nigrithorax
- Helina fuscisquama
- Helina nervosa
- Heliographa ceylanica
- Hydrotaea australis
- Hydrotaea jacobsoni
- Limnophora albonigra
- Limnophora himalayensis
- Limnophora prominens
- Limnophora tinctipennis
- Lispe bengalensis
- Lispe binotata
- Lispe flavicornis
- Lispe incerta
- Lispe kowarzi
- Lispe mirabilis
- Lispe sericipalpis
- Lispocephala tinctipennis
- Mitroplatia albisquama
- Morellia albisquama
- Morellia biseta
- Morellia hortensia
- Morellia pectinipes
- Morellia quadriremis
- Morellia sordidisquama
- Musca cassara
- Musca conducens
- Musca confiscata
- Musca convexifrons
- Musca craggi
- Musca crassirostris
- Musca domestica
- Musca fletcheri
- Musca formosana
- Musca hervei
- Musca inferior
- Musca pattoni
- Musca planiceps
- Musca seniorwhitei
- Musca ventrosa
- Mydaea diaphana
- Mydaea fuscisquama
- Mydaea morosa
- Mydaea nervosa
- Mydaea pallens
- Mydaea splendida
- Mydaea tuberculifacies
- Myospila argentata
- Myospila femorata
- Myospila laveis
- Myospila morosa
- Myospila ruficollis
- Neomyia claripennis
- Neomyia coeruleifrons
- Neomyia diffidens
- Neomyia fletcheri
- Neomyia gavisa
- Neomyia indica
- Neomyia lauta
- Neomyia steini
- Neomyia stella
- Neomyia timorensis
- Ophyra spinigera
- Phaonia auricoxa
- Phaonia caeruleicolor
- Pygophora hopkinsi
- Pygophora immaculipennis
- Pygophora keiseri
- Pygophora lutescens
- Pygophora macularis
- Pygophora microchaeta
- Pygophora nigricauda
- Pygophora plumifera
- Pygophora xanthogaster
- Rhynchomydaea tuberculifacies
- Stomoxys indicus
- Stomoxys plurinotata
- Stomoxys sitiens
- Tamilomyia dichaetomyiina

=== Family: Mycetophilidae - Fungus gnats ===
- Acnemia asiatica
- Allodia varicornis
- Aneura pinguis
- Anomalomyia affinis - endemic genus
- Anomalomyia basalis
- Anomalomyia flavicauda
- Anomalomyia guttata
- Anomalomyia immaculata
- Anomalomyia intermedia
- Anomalomyia minor
- Anomalomyia nasuta
- Anomalomyia obscura
- Anomalomyia picta
- Anomalomyia subobscura
- Anomalomyia thompsoni
- Anomalomyia viatoris
- Anthracophaga sulcifrons
- Azana asiatica
- Boraceomyia cajuensis
- Boraceomyia paulistensis
- Brevicornu callidum
- Clastobasis fugitiva
- Clastobasis lepida
- Docosia caniripes
- Dziedzickia basalis
- Epicypta bilunulata
- Epicypta ferruginea
- Epicypta flavohirta
- Epicypta nigroflava
- Epicypta pectenipes
- Epicypta setosiventris
- Exechia albicincta
- Exechia ampullata
- Exechia argenteofasciata
- Exechia boracensis
- Exechia cristata
- Exechia cristatoides
- Exechia paramirastoma
- Exechia zeylanica
- Exechiopsis bifida
- Greenomyia fugitiva
- Greenomyia lepida
- Clastobasis fugitiva
- Clastobasis lepida
- Leia annulicornis
- Leia arcuata
- Manota orientalis
- Manota sespinaea
- Neoempheria bifascipennis
- Neoempheria unifascipennis
- Zygomyia valepedro

=== Family: Mydidae - Mydas flies ===
- Leptomydas notos

=== Family: Nemestrinidae - Tangle-veined flies ===
- Atriadops javana
- Ceyloniola magnifica - monotypic endemic genus
- Hirmoneura brunnea
- Hirmoneura coffeata

=== Family: Neriidae - Stilt-legged flies ===
- Chaetonerius comperei
- Gymnonerius ceylanicus
- Telostylus latibrachium

=== Family: Nycteribiidae - Bat flies ===
- Basilia amiculata
- Basilia eileenae
- Basilia pumila
- Basilia punctata
- Cyclopodia sykesii
- Eucampsipoda latisternum
- Leptocyclopodia ferrarii
- Nycteribia allotopa
- Penicillidia indica
- Phthiridium ceylonicum
- Phthiridium phillipsi

=== Family: Pachyneuridae ===
- Haruka elegans

=== Family: Periscelididae ===
- Stenomicra fascipennis

=== Family: Phoridae - Scuttle flies ===
- Ceylonoxenia bugnioni
- Ceylonoxenia butteli
- Clitelloxenia clitellaria
- Clitelloxenia paradeniyae
- Diplonevra ater
- Diplonevra cinctiventris
- Megaselia achatinae
- Megaselia argiopephaga
- Megaselia bowlesi
- Megaselia deningi
- Megaselia hepworthae
- Megaselia pseudoscalaris
- Megaselia reynoldsi
- Megaselia robinsoni
- Puliciphora trisclerita
- Rhynchomicropteron puliciforme
- Spiniphora conspicua

=== Family: Pipunculidae - Big-headed flies ===
- Cephalops magnimembrus
- Eudorylas angustipennis
- Eudorylas beckeri
- Eudorylas biroi
- Tomosvaryella aeneiventris
- Tomosvaryella singalensis

=== Family: Platypezidae - Flat-footed flies ===
- Lindneromyia brunettii
- Lindneromyia cirrhocera
- Lindneromyia curta
- Lindneromyia kandyi
- Microsania lanka
- Platypeza brunettii
- Platypeza nepalensis
- Polyporivora nepalensis

=== Family: Platystomatidae - Signal flies ===
- Elassogaster linearis
- Euprosopia dorsata
- Euprosopia latifrons
- Euprosopia nigropunctata
- Euprosopia planiceps
- Euprosopia platystomoides
- Lamprophthalma felderi
- Plagiostenopterina cinctaria
- Plagiostenopterina dubiosa
- Plagiostenopterina fasciata
- Plagiostenopterina rufa
- Pseudepicausta angulata
- Pterogenia niveitarsis
- Rivellia costalis
- Rivellia eximia
- Rivellia frugalis
- Rivellia furcata
- Rivellia fusca
- Rivellia herinella

=== Family: Psilidae - Rust flies ===
- Chyliza cylindrica
- Chyliza pseudomunda
- Loxocera brevibuccata
- Loxocera insolita
- Sargus decorus
- Sargus metallinus

=== Family: Psychodidae - Moth flies ===
- Brunettia albohumeralis
- Brunettia albonotata
- Brunettia atrisquamis
- Brunettia uzeli
- Clogmia albipunctata
- Neotelmatoscopus acutus
- Neotelmatoscopus rotundus
- Phlebotomus argentipes
- Phlebotomus annandalei
- Phlebotomus glaucus
- Phlebotomus stantoni
- Psychoda acanthostyla
- Psychoda alabangensis
- Psychoda aponensos
- Psychoda formosana
- Psychoda geniculata
- Psychoda maculipennis
- Psychoda mediocris
- Psychoda vagabunda
- Sergentomyia arboris
- Sergentomyia insularis
- Telmatoscopus flavicollis
- Telmatoscopus proximus

=== Family: Pyrgotidae - Picture-winged flies ===
- Peltodasia magnicornis
- Peltodesia magnicornis
- Taeniomastix pictiventris
- Taeniomastix unicolor

=== Family: Rhagionidae - Snipe flies ===
- Chrysopilus latus
- Chrysopilus magnipennis
- Chrysopilus opalescens
- Chrysopilus similis
- Chrysopilus yerburyi

=== Family: Rhiniidae ===
- Metallea clausa

=== Family: Rhinophoridae - Woodlouse flies ===
- Ptilocera fastuosa
- Ptilocera smaragdifera

=== Family: Sarcophagidae - Flesh flies ===
- Amobia auriceps
- Apodacra ceylonica
- Dolichotachina melanura
- Eremasiomyia orientalis
- Heteronychia calicifera
- Hoplacephala asiatica
- Hoplacephala mirabilis
- Krombeinomyia mirabilis
- Metopia argyrocephala
- Metopia nudibasis
- Phyllarista rohdendorfi
- Phylloteles argyrozoster
- Phylloteles ballucapitatus
- Phylloteles longiunguis
- Phylloteles rohdendorfi
- Protomiltogramma nandii
- Protomiltogramma seniorwhitei
- Pterella krombeini
- Sarcophaga alba
- Sarcophaga annandalei
- Sarcophaga futilis
- Sarcophaga henryi
- Sarcophaga kempi
- Sarcophaga martellata
- Sarcophaga martellatoides
- Sarcophaga peregrina
- Sarcophaga scopariiformis
- Sarcophaga talonata
- Sarcophaga zaitzevi
- Thereomyia nandii
- Thereomyia seniorwhitei

=== Family: Sciaridae - Dark-winged fungus gnats ===
- Odontosciara exacta

=== Family: Scathophagidae - Dung flies ===
- Cordilura lineata
- Cordilura pudica
- Cordilura punctipes
- Parallelomma banski

=== Family: Scatopsidae - Dung midges ===
- Colobostema metarhamphe
- Colobostema occabipes
- Psectrosciara brunnescens
- Rhegmoclema hirtipenne
- Scatopse brunnescens
- Scatopse pilosa
- Scatopse zeylanica

=== Family: Scenopinidae - Window flies ===
- Scenopinus longiventris
- Scenopinus papuanus

=== Family: Sciaridae - Dark-winged fungus gnats ===
- Apelmocreagris simulator

=== Family: Sciomyzidae - Marsh flies ===
- Sepedon crishna
- Sepedon ferruginosa

=== Family: Sepsidae - Black scavenger flies ===
- Perochaeta hennigi
- Sepsis thoracica
- Toxopoda contracta

=== Family: Simuliidae - Black flies ===
- Simulium bulla
- Simulium ceylonicum
- Simulium cremnosi
- Simulium cruszi
- Simulium dola
- Simulium ela
- Simulium krombeini
- Simulium languidum
- Simulium nilgiricum
- Simulium nubis
- Simulium paranubis
- Simulium striatum
- Simulium subpalmatum
- Simulium trirugosum

=== Family: Sphaeroceridae - Lesser dung flies ===
- Aspinilimonina postocellaris
- Ceroptera equitans
- Chaetopodella nigrinotum
- Coproica ferrguinata
- Coproica ferruginata
- Coproica hirtula
- Lotobia asiatica
- Lotobia pallidiventris
- Norrbomia marginatis
- Norrbomia tropica
- Opacifrons brevisecunda
- Opacifrons cederholmi
- Paralimosina ceylanica
- Pellucialula polyseta
- Poecilosomella aciculata
- Poecilosomella affinis
- Poecilosomella borboroides
- Poecilosomella nigra
- Poecilosomella pappi
- Poecilosomella punctipennis
- Poecilosomella varians
- Rachispoda filiforceps
- Rachispoda fuscipennis
- Spinilimosina brevicostata
- Trachyopella leucoptera

=== Family: Stratiomyidae - Soldier flies ===
- Acrochaeta dimidiata
- Adoxomyia heminopla
- Allognosta annulifemur
- Allognosta fuscitarsis
- Ankylacantha keiseri - endemic genus
- Argyrobrithes albopilosa
- Atherigona lamda - endemic genus
- Aulana confirmata
- Beris javana
- Cibotogaster azurea
- Clitellaria heminopla
- Gabaza albiseta
- Hermetia illucens
- Hermetia inflata
- Microchrysa flavicornis
- Microchrysa flaviventris
- Microchrysa vertebrata
- Massicyta inflata
- Nigritomyia ceylonica
- Nigritomyia maculipennis
- Odontomyia angustilimbata
- Odontomyia cyanea
- Odontomyia fascipes
- Oplodontha minuta
- Oplodontha punctifacies
- Oplodontha rubrithorax
- Oxycera whitei
- Pachygaster transmarinus
- Pegadomyia ceylonica
- Prosopochrysa vitripennis
- Ptecticus australis
- Ptecticus cingulatus
- Ptecticus pseudohistrio
- Ptecticus srilankai
- Ptilocera fastuosa
- Ptilocera fastuosa
- Ptilocera smaragdifera
- Ptilocera smaragdina
- Sargus contractus
- Sargus flaviventris
- Sargus gselli
- Sargus metallinus
- Sargus splendidus
- Stratiomys fenestrata
- Stratiomys minuta
- Strophognathus argentatus - monotypic endemic genus
- Tinda javana

=== Family: Streblidae - Streblid bat flies ===
- Brachytarsina cucullata
- Brachytarsina joblingi
- Brachytarsina modesta
- Brachytarsina pygialis
- Brachytarsina speiseri
- Raymondia pagodarum
- Speiserella lobulata

=== Family: Syrphidae - Hoverflies ===
- Allobaccha amphithoe
- Allobaccha fallax
- Allobaccha oldroydi
- Allobaccha pulchrifrons
- Allobaccha triangulifera
- Asarkina ayyari
- Asarkina belli
- Asarkina pitamara
- Asarkina porcina
- Betasyrphus fletcheri
- Calcaretropidia triangulifera
- Ceriana ornatifrons
- Chrysogaster aerosa
- Chrysogaster basalis
- Chrysogaster hirtella
- Chrysogaster incisa
- Chrysogaster insignis
- Chrysogaster longicornis
- Chrysogaster tarsata
- Chrysotoxum baphyrus
- Citrogramma henryi
- Dasysyrphus orsua
- Dideopsis aegrota
- Dideopsis aegrota
- Eosphaerophoria dentiscutellata
- Episyrphus nubilipennis
- Episyrphus viridaureus
- Eristalinus arvorum
- Eristalinus invirgulatus
- Eristalinus lucilia
- Eristalinus megacephalus
- Eristalinus multifarius
- Eristalinus paria
- Eristalinus quadristriatus
- Eristalis curvipes
- Eumerus argentipes
- Eumerus aurifrons
- Eumerus coeruleifrons
- Eumerus figurans
- Eumerus nicobarensis
- Eumerus singhalensis
- Eumerus sita
- Graptomyza brevirostris
- Graptomyza coomani
- Helophilus curvigaster
- Indascia gracilis
- Mallota curvigaster
- Mallota vilis
- Melanostoma apicale
- Melanostoma ceylonense
- Melanostoma scalare
- Meliscaeva ceylonica
- Meliscaeva monticola
- Microdon elisabeth
- Microdon fulvopubescens
- Microdon lanka
- Microdon montis
- Microdon taprobanicus
- Paragus auritus
- Paragus crenulatus
- Paragus rufocincta
- Paragus yerburiensis
- Phytomia errans
- Pipizella rufocincta
- Rhinobaccha gracilis
- Simosyrphus grandicornis
- Sphaerophoria indiana
- Sphaerophoria macrogaster
- Syritta proximata
- Syritta triangulifera
- Tropidia bambusifolia
- Tropidia curculigoides
- Tropidia septemnervis
- Xanthandrus ceylonicus
- Xanthogramma eoa
- Xylota atroparva

=== Family: Tabanidae - Horseflies ===
- Atylotus agrestis
- Atylotus virgo
- Chrysops dispar
- Chrysops dubiens
- Chrysops fasciatus
- Chrysops fixissimus
- Chrysops flaviventris
- Chrysops flavocinctus
- Chrysops srilankensis
- Chrysops translucens
- Cydistomyia brunnea
- Cydistomyia ceylonicus
- Cydistomyia laeta
- Cydistomyia minor
- Cydistomyia philipi
- Cydistomyia pilipennis
- Cydistomyia putea
- Cydistomyia tibialis
- Dichelacera tetradelta
- Gastroxides ater
- Gastroxides ornatus
- Haematopota bequaerti
- Haematopota brevis
- Haematopota cingalensis
- Haematopota krombeini
- Haematopota litoralis- subsp. rhizophorae
- Haematopota roralis
- Haematopota tessellata
- Haematopota unizonata
- Hybomitra minshanensis
- Lissimodes ceylonicus
- Lissimodes minor
- Philoliche taprobanes
- Philoliche zernyi
- Silviomyza picea - monotypic endemic genus
- Silvius ceylonicus
- Stenotabanus sphaeriscapus
- Tabanus angustilimbatus
- Tabanus atrohirtus
- Tabanus brincki
- Tabanus ceylonicus
- Tabanus discrepans
- Tabanus diversifrons
- Tabanus dorsiger
- Tabanus flavissimus
- Tabanus fuscicauda
- Tabanus griseifacies
- Tabanus indiscriminatus
- Tabanus inflatipalpis
- Tabanus jucundus
- Tabanus krombeini
- Tabanus obconicus
- Tabanus particolor
- Tabanus pullus
- Tabanus puteus
- Tabanus speciosus
- Tabanus striatus
- Tabanus tenens
- Tabanus thellus
- Tabanus tumidicallus
- Tabanus wilpattuensis
- Udenocera brunnea - monotypic endemic genus

=== Family: Tachinidae - Tachina flies ===
- Aneogmena fischeri
- Aneogmena rutherfordi
- Aneogmena secunda
- Argyrophylax franseni
- Argyrophylax fransseni
- Atractocerops ceylanicus
- Austrophorocera grandis
- Austrophorocera laetifica
- Austrophorocera lucagus
- Austrophorocera solennis
- Blepharella lateralis
- Blepharipa orbitalis
- Blepharipa zebina
- Carcelia atripes
- Carcelia bakeri
- Carcelia caudata
- Carcelia ceylanica
- Carcelia excisa
- Carcelia latistylata
- Carcelia rasoides
- Carcelia subferrifera
- Carcelia sumatrana
- Chetogena bezziana
- Clausicella molitor
- Cylindromyia umbripennis
- Delta pyriforme
- Dinera meridionalis
- Doleschalla elongata
- Drino curvipalpis
- Eutrixopsis paradoxa
- Halydaia luteicornis
- Hermya beelzebul
- Isosturmia intermedia
- Isosturmia picta
- Medinodexia morgana
- Nealsomyia rufella
- Nealsomyia rufipes
- Paradrino laevicula
- Phasia triangulata
- Phorocera vagator
- Prosena siberita
- Prosheliomyia nietneri
- Rutilia rubriceps
- Sisyropa formosa
- Sisyropa heterusiae
- Stevenia ceylanica
- Sumpigaster flavipennis
- Thecocarcelia thrix
- Thelaira macropus
- Torocca fasciata
- Urodexia penicillum
- Winthemia mallochi
- Winthemia trichopareia
- Zenillia anomala
- Zenillia nymphalidophaga

=== Family: Tephritidae - Fruit flies ===
- Acanthiophilus astrophorus
- Acinoeuphranta zeylanica
- Acroceratitis striata
- Actinoptera biseta
- Actinoptera brahma
- Actinoptera formosana
- Adrama austeni
- Bactrocera apicofuscans
- Bactrocera bipustulata
- Bactrocera brunneola
- Bactrocera caryeae
- Bactrocera caudata
- Bactrocera ceylanica
- Bactrocera correcta
- Bactrocera cucurbitae
- Bactrocera diaphora
- Bactrocera diversa
- Bactrocera dorsalis
- Bactrocera duplicata
- Bactrocera expandens
- Bactrocera fastigata
- Bactrocera fernandoi
- Bactrocera garciniae
- Bactrocera gavisa
- Bactrocera hantanae
- Bactrocera invadens
- Bactrocera kandiensis
- Bactrocera latifrons
- Bactrocera nigrofemoralis
- Bactrocera nigrotibialis
- Bactrocera perigrapha
- Bactrocera profunda
- Bactrocera selenophora
- Bactrocera syzygii
- Bactrocera tau
- Bactrocera trilineata
- Bactrocera verbascifoliae
- Bactrocera versicolor
- Bactrocera tau
- Bactrocera invadens
- Bactrocera verbascifoliae
- Bactrocera zahadi
- Campiglossa aeneostriata
- Campiglossa agatha
- Coelotrypes luteifasciata
- Dacus cliatus
- Dacus discophorus
- Dacus keiseri
- Dacus longicornis
- Dacus nepalensis
- Dacus persicus
- Dacus ramanii
- Dioxyna picciola
- Elaphromyia siva
- Euphranta conjuncta
- Euphranta zeylanica
- Galbifascia quadripunctata
- Goniurellia persignata
- Hexacinia radiosa
- Meracanthomyia gamma
- Metasphenisca reinhardi
- Oxyaciura monochaeta
- Oxyaciura xanthotricha
- Platensina acrostacta
- Platensina zodiacalis
- Pliomelaena translucida
- Rhabdochaeta pulchella
- Rhochmopterum seniorwhitei
- Rioxa discalis
- Rioxa lanceolata
- Rioxa parvipunctata
- Scedella orientalis
- Scedella spiloptera
- Sophiroides flammosa
- Spathulina acroleuca
- Sphaeniscus melanotrichotus
- Sphaeniscus quadrincisus
- Sphenella sinensis
- Tephraciura basimacula
- Tritaeniopteron punctatipleurum
- Trupanea amoena
- Trupanea aucta
- Xarnuta leucotela

=== Family: Therevidae - Stiletto flies ===
- Irwiniella ceylonica
- Irwiniella sequa
- Megapalla curvata
- Phycus brunneus
- Phycus frommeri
- Phycus hauseri
- Phycus minutus
- Schoutedenomyia argentiventris

=== Family: Tipulidae - Crane flies ===
- Holorusia ochripes
- Indotipula demarcata
- Indotipula palnica
- Indotipula singhalica
- Leptotarsus errans
- Leptotarsus zeylanica
- Nephrotoma javensis
- Nephrotoma pleurinotata
- Prionota serraticornis
- Pselliophora henryi
- Pselliophora laeta - subsp. laeta, strigidorsum
- Pselliophora taprobanes
- Tipula hampsoni
- Tipulodina brunettiella
- Tipulodina ceylonica
- Tipulodina gracillima

=== Family: Ulidiidae - picture-winged flies ===
- Physiphora clausa
- Physiphora longicornis

=== Family: Xylomyidae - Wood soldier flies ===
- Solva inamoena

=== Family: Xylophagidae - Awl-flies ===
- Rachicerus aterrimus
- Rachicerus bicolor
- Rachicerus rusticus
- Rachicerus spissus
- Xylophagus brunneus
