= Actinoptera =

Scientific classification
- Kingdom: Animalia
- Phylum: Arthropoda
- Class: Insecta
- Order: Diptera
- Family: Tephritidae
- Subfamily: Tephritinae
- Tribe: Tephritini
- Genus: Actinoptera; Rondani, 1871

Type species
- Trypeta aestiva Meigen, 1826

Genus of flies

Actinoptera is a genus of tephritid or fruit flies in the family Tephritidae.

== Species ==
- Actinoptera abdita Munro, 1957
- Actinoptera acculta Munro, 1957
- Actinoptera ampla Munro, 1957
- Actinoptera biseta Hering, 1956
- Actinoptera brahma (Schiner, 1868)
- Actinoptera carignaniensis Kapoor & Grewal, 1977
- Actinoptera conexa Ito, 2011
- Actinoptera contacta Munro, 1957
- Actinoptera discoidea (Fallén, 1814)
- Actinoptera espunensis Hering, 1934
- Actinoptera filaginis (Loew, 1862)
- Actinoptera formosana Shiraki, 1933
- Actinoptera fuscula Munro, 1957
- Actinoptera kovacsi (Bezzi, 1924)
- Actinoptera lindneri Hering, 1954
- Actinoptera mamulae (Frauenfeld, 1855)
- Actinoptera meigeni Hendel, 1927
- Actinoptera montana (Meijere, 1924)
- Actinoptera mundella (Bezzi, 1924)
- Actinoptera pallidula Munro, 1957
- Actinoptera peregrina (Adams, 1905)
- Actinoptera reticulata Ito, 1984
- Actinoptera rosetta Munro, 1934
- Actinoptera schnabeli (Speiser, 1924)
- Actinoptera shirakiana Munro, 1935
- Actinoptera sinica Wang, 1990
- Actinoptera stricta Munro, 1957
- Actinoptera tatarica Hendel, 1927
- Actinoptera tientsinensis Chen, 1938
- Actinoptera tuckeri (Bezzi, 1924)
- Actinoptera vinsoni Munro, 1946
