= Desmella conyzae =

Scientific classification
- Kingdom: Animalia
- Phylum: Arthropoda
- Class: Insecta
- Order: Diptera
- Family: Tephritidae
- Subfamily: Tephritinae
- Tribe: Tephritini
- Genus: Desmella
- Species: D. conyzae

Binomial name
- Desmella conyzae (Frauenfeld, 1857)

Synonyms
- Trypeta conyzae Frauenfeld, 1857

Species of fly

Desmella conyzae is a species of tephritid or fruit flies in the genus Desmella of the family Tephritidae.

== Distribution ==
Egypt.
