= Desmella =

Scientific classification
- Kingdom: Animalia
- Phylum: Arthropoda
- Class: Insecta
- Order: Diptera
- Family: Tephritidae
- Subfamily: Tephritinae
- Tribe: Tephritini
- Genus: Desmella; Munro, 1957

Type species
- Trypeta anceps (Loew, 1861)

Genus of flies

Desmella is a genus of tephritid or fruit flies in the family Tephritidae.

== Species ==
- Desmella anceps (Loew, 1861)
- Desmella clarinetta (Munro, 1939)
- Desmella conyzae (Frauenfeld, 1857)
- Desmella myiopitoides (Bezzi, 1908)
- Desmella rostellata (Séguy, 1941)
