= Scedella caffra =

Scientific classification
- Kingdom: Animalia
- Phylum: Arthropoda
- Class: Insecta
- Order: Diptera
- Family: Tephritidae
- Subfamily: Tephritinae
- Tribe: Tephritini
- Genus: Scedella
- Species: S. caffra

Binomial name
- Scedella caffra (Loew, 1861)

Synonyms
- Trypeta caffra Loew, 1861; Mesoclanis illuminata Hering, 1939

Species of fly

Scedella caffra is a species of tephritid or fruit flies in the genus Scedella of the family Tephritidae.

== Distribution ==
Burundi, Uganda, Mozambique, Zimbabwe, South Africa.
