= Scedella dissoluta =

Scientific classification
- Kingdom: Animalia
- Phylum: Arthropoda
- Class: Insecta
- Order: Diptera
- Family: Tephritidae
- Subfamily: Tephritinae
- Tribe: Tephritini
- Genus: Scedella
- Species: S. dissoluta

Binomial name
- Scedella dissoluta (Loew, 1861)

Synonyms
- Trypeta dissoluta Loew, 1861; Euribia tristrigata Bezzi, 1918

Species of fly

Scedella dissoluta is a species of tephritid or fruit flies in the genus Scedella of the family Tephritidae.

== Distribution ==
Eritrea, Uganda, Kenya, Tanzania, Zimbabwe, Namibia.
