= Goniurellia longicauda =

Scientific classification
- Kingdom: Animalia
- Phylum: Arthropoda
- Class: Insecta
- Order: Diptera
- Family: Tephritidae
- Subfamily: Tephritinae
- Tribe: Tephritini
- Genus: Goniurellia
- Species: G. longicauda

Binomial name
- Goniurellia longicauda Freidberg, 1980

Species of fly

Goniurellia longicauda is a species of tephritid or fruit flies in the genus Goniurellia of the family Tephritidae.

== Distribution ==
France, Canary Island, Morocco to Egypt, Turkey, Syria, Israel.
