= Scedella sandoana =

Scientific classification
- Kingdom: Animalia
- Phylum: Arthropoda
- Class: Insecta
- Order: Diptera
- Family: Tephritidae
- Subfamily: Tephritinae
- Tribe: Tephritini
- Genus: Scedella
- Species: S. sandoana

Binomial name
- Scedella sandoana Munro, 1957

Synonyms
- Scedella sandoana Munro, 1956

Species of fly

Scedella sandoana is a species of tephritid or fruit flies in the genus Scedella of the family Tephritidae.

== Distribution ==
Congo, Rwanda, Kenya.
