= Actinoptera peregrina =

Scientific classification
- Kingdom: Animalia
- Phylum: Arthropoda
- Clade: Pancrustacea
- Class: Insecta
- Order: Diptera
- Family: Tephritidae
- Subfamily: Tephritinae
- Tribe: Tephritini
- Genus: Actinoptera
- Species: A. peregrina

Binomial name
- Actinoptera peregrina (Adams, 1905)

Synonyms
- Urellia peregrina Adams, 1905; Trypanea urophora Bezzi, 1918

Species of fly

Actinoptera peregrina is a species of tephritid or fruit flies in the genus Actinoptera of the family Tephritidae.

== Distribution ==
Malawi, Mozambique, Zimbabwe, Namibia, South Africa.
