= Actinoptera ampla =

Scientific classification
- Kingdom: Animalia
- Phylum: Arthropoda
- Class: Insecta
- Order: Diptera
- Family: Tephritidae
- Subfamily: Tephritinae
- Tribe: Tephritini
- Genus: Actinoptera
- Species: A. ampla

Binomial name
- Actinoptera ampla Munro, 1957

Species of fly

Actinoptera ampla is a species of tephritid or fruit flies in the genus Actinoptera of the family Tephritidae.

== Distribution ==
Zimbabwe, South Africa.
