= Coproica acutangula =

Scientific classification
- Domain: Eukaryota
- Kingdom: Animalia
- Phylum: Arthropoda
- Class: Insecta
- Order: Diptera
- Family: Sphaeroceridae
- Genus: Coproica
- Species: C. acutangula

Binomial name
- Coproica acutangula (Zetterstedt, 1847)

Synonyms
- Limosina acutangula Zetterstedt, 1847

Species of fly

Coproica acutangula is a species of lesser dung fly in the family Sphaeroceridae. It is found in Europe.
