= Actinoptera filaginis =

Scientific classification
- Kingdom: Animalia
- Phylum: Arthropoda
- Class: Insecta
- Order: Diptera
- Family: Tephritidae
- Subfamily: Tephritinae
- Tribe: Tephritini
- Genus: Actinoptera
- Species: A. filaginis

Binomial name
- Actinoptera filaginis (Loew, 1862)

Synonyms
- Urellia filaginis Loew, 1862; Trypeta terminata Meigen, 1826; Ditricha helichrysi Rondani, 1871

Species of fly

Actinoptera filaginis is a species of tephritid or fruit flies in the genus Actinoptera of the family Tephritidae.

== Distribution ==
France, Germany, Italy, Sweden, East Europe.
