= Scedella basilewskyi =

Scientific classification
- Kingdom: Animalia
- Phylum: Arthropoda
- Class: Insecta
- Order: Diptera
- Family: Tephritidae
- Subfamily: Tephritinae
- Tribe: Tephritini
- Genus: Scedella
- Species: S. basilewskyi

Binomial name
- Scedella basilewskyi (Munro, 1956)

Synonyms
- Paroxyna basilewskyi Munro, 1956

Species of fly

Scedella basilewskyi is a species of tephritid or fruit flies in the genus Scedella of the family Tephritidae.

== Distribution ==
Rwanda.
