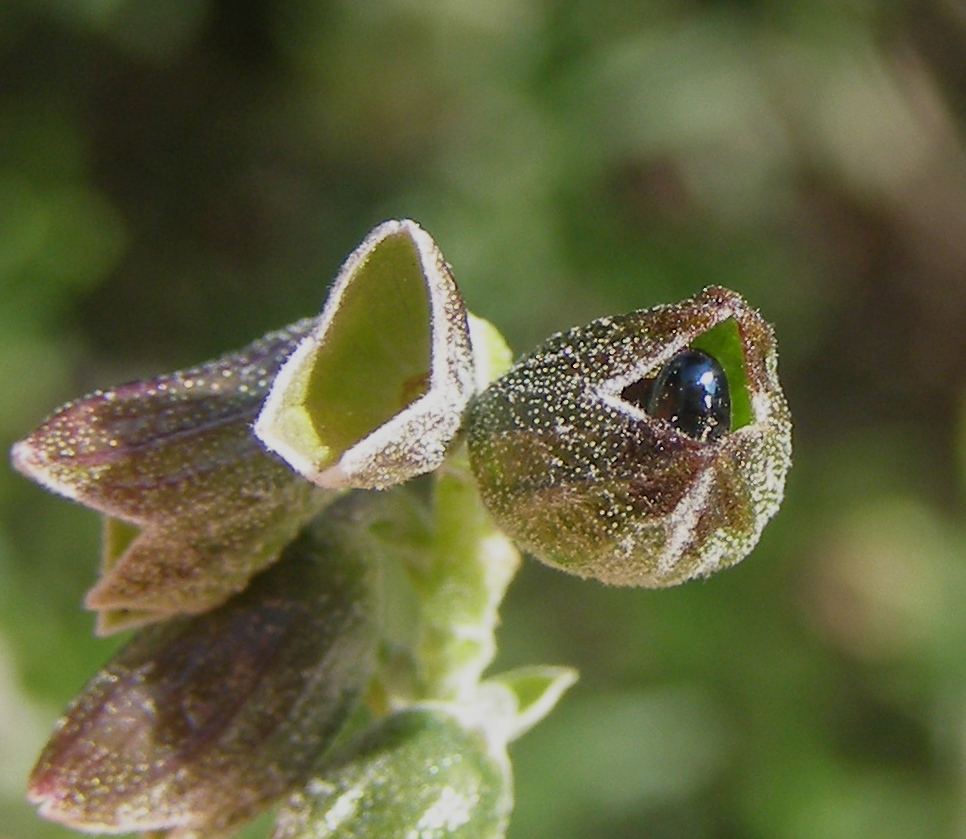
- Oxyaciura tibialis

Scientific classification
- Kingdom: Animalia
- Phylum: Arthropoda
- Class: Insecta
- Order: Diptera
- Family: Tephritidae
- Subfamily: Tephritinae
- Tribe: Tephrellini
- Genus: Oxyaciura; Hendel, 1927

Type species
- Aciura tibialis Robineau-Desvoidy, 1830

Synonyms
- Indaciura Hering, 1942

= Oxyaciura =

Genus of flies

Oxyaciura is a genus of tephritid or fruit flies in the family Tephritidae.

== Species ==
- Oxyaciura formosae (Hendel, 1915)
- Oxyaciura monochaeta (Bezzi, 1913)
- Oxyaciura tibialis (Robineau-Desvoidy, 1830)
- Oxyaciura xanthotricha (Bezzi, 1913)
