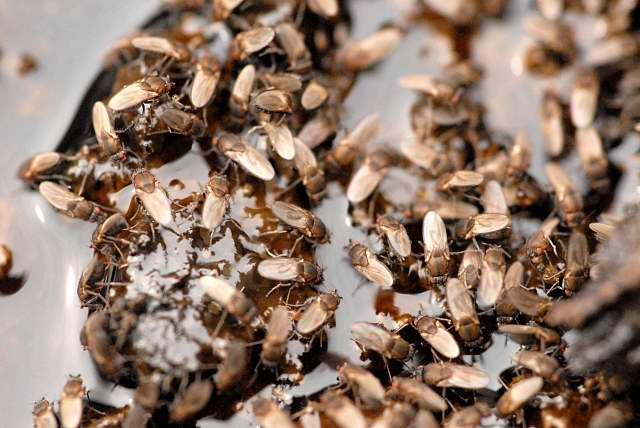
- Coproica ferruginata

Scientific classification
- Kingdom: Animalia
- Phylum: Arthropoda
- Class: Insecta
- Order: Diptera
- Family: Sphaeroceridae
- Subfamily: Limosininae
- Genus: Coproica; Rondani, 1861

Type species
- Limosina acutangula Zetterstedt, 1847

Synonyms
- Heteroptera Macquart; Coprophila Duda, 1918

= Coproica =

Genus of flies

Coproica is a genus of flies belonging to the family Sphaeroceridae.

== Species ==
- C. acutangula (Zetterstedt, 1847)
- C. albiseta Papp, 2008
- C. aliena Papp, 2008
- C. bispinosa Papp, 2008
- C. brevivenosa Papp, 2008
- C. cacti (Richards, 1960)
- C. coreana Papp, 1979
- C. demeteri Papp, 2008
- C. dentata Papp, 1973
- C. digitata (Duda, 1918)
- C. ferruginata (Stenhammar, 1855)
- C. flavifacies Papp, 2008
- C. ghanensis Papp, 1979
- C. hirticula Collin, 1956
- C. hirtula (Rondani, 1880)
- C. hirtuloidea (Duda, 1925)
- C. insulaepasqualis Enderlein, 1938
- C. lacteipennis Hayashi, 2005
- C. lugubris (Haliday, 1835)
- C. microps Papp, 2008
- C. mitchelli (Malloch, 1913)
- C. pappi Carles-Tolrá, 1990
- C. perlugubris Papp, 2008
- C. pseudolacteipennis Papp, 2008
- C. pusio (Zetterstedt, 1847)
- C. rohaceki Carles-Tolrá, 1990
- C. rufifrons Hayashi, 1991
- C. ruwenzoriensis (Vanschuytbroeck, 1950)
- C. saprophaga Papp, 2008
- C. serra (Richards, 1938)
- C. setulosa (Duda, 1929)
- C. thaii Papp, 2008
- C. unispinosa Papp, 2008
- C. urbana (Richards, 1960)
- C. vagans (Haliday, 1833)
