= Actinoptera montana =

Scientific classification
- Kingdom: Animalia
- Phylum: Arthropoda
- Class: Insecta
- Order: Diptera
- Family: Tephritidae
- Subfamily: Tephritinae
- Tribe: Tephritini
- Genus: Actinoptera
- Species: A. montana

Binomial name
- Actinoptera montana (Meijere, 1924)

Synonyms
- Tephritis montana Meijere, 1924; Trypanea separata Zia, 1937

Species of fly

Actinoptera montana is a species of tephritid or fruit flies in the genus Actinoptera of the family Tephritidae.

== Distribution ==
India, China, Japan, Philippines, Indonesia.
