= Actinoptera discoidea =

Scientific classification
- Kingdom: Animalia
- Phylum: Arthropoda
- Class: Insecta
- Order: Diptera
- Family: Tephritidae
- Subfamily: Tephritinae
- Tribe: Tephritini
- Genus: Actinoptera
- Species: A. discoidea

Binomial name
- Actinoptera discoidea (Fallén, 1814)

Synonyms
- Tephritis discoidea Fallén, 1814; Trypeta aestiva Meigen, 1826; Trypeta gnaphalii Loew, 1844

Species of fly

Actinoptera discoidea is a species of tephritid or fruit flies in the genus Actinoptera of the family Tephritidae.

== Distribution ==
Sweden, France, Central Europe, Ukraine, Caucasus.
