= Desmella clarinetta =

Scientific classification
- Kingdom: Animalia
- Phylum: Arthropoda
- Class: Insecta
- Order: Diptera
- Family: Tephritidae
- Subfamily: Tephritinae
- Tribe: Tephritini
- Genus: Desmella
- Species: D. clarinetta

Binomial name
- Desmella clarinetta (Munro, 1939)

Synonyms
- Paroxyna clarinetta Munro, 1939

Species of fly

Desmella clarinetta is a species of tephritid or fruit flies in the genus Desmella of the family Tephritidae.

== Distribution ==
South Africa.
