= Goniurellia lacerata =

Scientific classification
- Kingdom: Animalia
- Phylum: Arthropoda
- Class: Insecta
- Order: Diptera
- Family: Tephritidae
- Subfamily: Tephritinae
- Tribe: Tephritini
- Genus: Goniurellia
- Species: G. lacerata

Binomial name
- Goniurellia lacerata (Becker, 1913)

Synonyms
- Trupanea lacerata Becker, 1913

Species of fly

Goniurellia lacerata is a species of tephritid or fruit flies in the genus Goniurellia of the family Tephritidae.

== Distribution ==
Egypt, Iran.
