= Actinoptera meigeni =

Scientific classification
- Kingdom: Animalia
- Phylum: Arthropoda
- Class: Insecta
- Order: Diptera
- Family: Tephritidae
- Subfamily: Tephritinae
- Tribe: Tephritini
- Genus: Actinoptera
- Species: A. meigeni

Binomial name
- Actinoptera meigeni Hendel, 1927

Species of fly

Actinoptera meigeni is a species of tephritid or fruit flies in the genus Actinoptera of the family Tephritidae.

== Distribution ==
France.
