= Desmella myiopitoides =

Scientific classification
- Kingdom: Animalia
- Phylum: Arthropoda
- Class: Insecta
- Order: Diptera
- Family: Tephritidae
- Subfamily: Tephritinae
- Tribe: Tephritini
- Genus: Desmella
- Species: D. myiopitoides

Binomial name
- Desmella myiopitoides (Bezzi, 1908)

Synonyms
- Ensina myiopitoides Bezzi, 1908

Species of fly

Desmella myiopitoides is a species of tephritid or fruit flies in the genus Desmella of the family Tephritidae.

== Distribution ==
Eritrea, Zimbabwe, South Africa.
