= Scedella praetexta =

Scientific classification
- Kingdom: Animalia
- Phylum: Arthropoda
- Class: Insecta
- Order: Diptera
- Family: Tephritidae
- Subfamily: Tephritinae
- Tribe: Tephritini
- Genus: Scedella
- Species: S. praetexta

Binomial name
- Scedella praetexta (Loew, 1861)

Synonyms
- Trypeta praetexta Loew, 1861

Species of fly

Scedella praetexta is a species of tephritid or fruit flies in the genus Scedella of the family Tephritidae.

== Distribution ==
Congo, Rwanda, Burundi, Uganda, Tanzania, Zimbabwe, South Africa.
