= Desmella anceps =

Scientific classification
- Kingdom: Animalia
- Phylum: Arthropoda
- Class: Insecta
- Order: Diptera
- Family: Tephritidae
- Subfamily: Tephritinae
- Tribe: Tephritini
- Genus: Desmella
- Species: D. anceps

Binomial name
- Desmella anceps (Loew, 1861)

Synonyms
- Trypeta anceps Loew, 1861; Ensina anceps var. fasciolata Bezzi, 1908

Species of fly

Desmella anceps is a species of tephritid or fruit flies in the genus Desmella of the family Tephritidae.

== Distribution ==
Morocco.
