= Goniurellia tridens =

Scientific classification
- Kingdom: Animalia
- Phylum: Arthropoda
- Class: Insecta
- Order: Diptera
- Family: Tephritidae
- Subfamily: Tephritinae
- Tribe: Tephritini
- Genus: Goniurellia
- Species: G. tridens

Binomial name
- Goniurellia tridens (Hendel, 1910)

Synonyms
- Urellia augur var. tridens Hendel, 1910

Species of fly

Goniurellia tridens is a species of tephritid or fruit flies in the genus Goniurellia of the family Tephritidae. Each wing of a Goniurellia tridens fly is transparent and bears a “precisely detailed image of an ant-like insect”.

== Distribution ==
Palestine, Saudi Arabia, Turkmenistan, Uzbekistan, Iran, Pakistan, India, Canary Islands.
