= Scedella formosella =

Scientific classification
- Kingdom: Animalia
- Phylum: Arthropoda
- Class: Insecta
- Order: Diptera
- Family: Tephritidae
- Subfamily: Tephritinae
- Tribe: Tephritini
- Genus: Scedella
- Species: S. formosella

Binomial name
- Scedella formosella (Hendel, 1915)

Synonyms
- Euribia formosella Hendel, 1915; Euaresta punctata Shiraki, 1968

Species of fly

Scedella formosella is a species of tephritid or fruit flies in the genus Scedella of the family Tephritidae.

== Distribution ==
Japan, Philippines, Malaysia to New Guinea, Solomon Islands, Guam.
