= Desmella rostellata =

Scientific classification
- Kingdom: Animalia
- Phylum: Arthropoda
- Class: Insecta
- Order: Diptera
- Family: Tephritidae
- Subfamily: Tephritinae
- Tribe: Tephritini
- Genus: Desmella
- Species: D. rostellata

Binomial name
- Desmella rostellata (Séguy, 1941)

Synonyms
- Paroxyna rostellata Séguy, 1941

Species of fly

Desmella rostellata is a species of tephritid or fruit flies in the genus Desmella of the family Tephritidae.

== Distribution ==
Morocco.
