= Goniurellia ebejeri =

Scientific classification
- Kingdom: Animalia
- Phylum: Arthropoda
- Class: Insecta
- Order: Diptera
- Family: Tephritidae
- Subfamily: Tephritinae
- Tribe: Tephritini
- Genus: Goniurellia
- Species: G. ebejeri

Binomial name
- Goniurellia ebejeri Merz, 2002

Species of fly

Goniurellia ebejeri is a species of tephritid or fruit flies in the genus Goniurellia of the family Tephritidae.

== Distribution ==
Oman.
