= Scedella cyana =

Scientific classification
- Kingdom: Animalia
- Phylum: Arthropoda
- Class: Insecta
- Order: Diptera
- Family: Tephritidae
- Subfamily: Tephritinae
- Tribe: Tephritini
- Genus: Scedella
- Species: S. cyana

Binomial name
- Scedella cyana (Walker, 1849)

Synonyms
- Trypeta cyana Walker, 1849

Species of fly

Scedella cyana is a species of tephritid or fruit flies in the genus Scedella of the family Tephritidae.

== Distribution ==
Sierra Leone.
