= Actinoptera reticulata =

Scientific classification
- Kingdom: Animalia
- Phylum: Arthropoda
- Class: Insecta
- Order: Diptera
- Family: Tephritidae
- Subfamily: Tephritinae
- Tribe: Tephritini
- Genus: Actinoptera
- Species: A. reticulata

Binomial name
- Actinoptera reticulata Ito, 1984

Species of fly

Actinoptera reticulata is a species of tephritid or fruit flies in the genus Actinoptera of the family Tephritidae.

== Distribution ==
Nepal, Japan.
