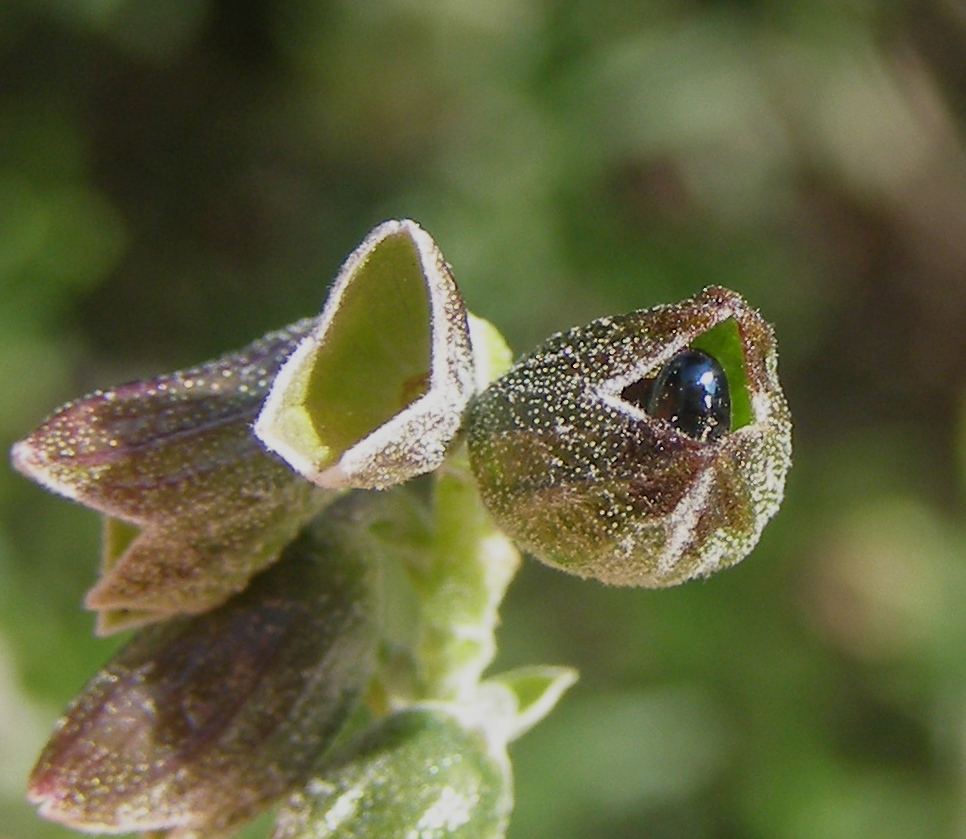
- Oxyaciura tibialis

Scientific classification
- Kingdom: Animalia
- Phylum: Arthropoda
- Class: Insecta
- Order: Diptera
- Family: Tephritidae
- Subfamily: Tephritinae
- Tribe: Tephrellini
- Genus: Oxyaciura
- Species: O. tibialis

Binomial name
- Oxyaciura tibialis Robineau-Desvoidy, 1830

Synonyms
- Aciura tibialis Robineau-Desvoidy, 1830; Aciura gagatea Becker, 1905; Trypeta gagates (Loew, 1846)

= Oxyaciura tibialis =

Species of fly

Oxyaciura tibialis is a species of tephritid or fruit flies in the genus Oxyaciura of the family Tephritidae.

== Distribution ==
Europe & North Africa to Kazakhstan, Afghanistan & Ethiopia.
