= Actinoptera tientsinensis =

Scientific classification
- Kingdom: Animalia
- Phylum: Arthropoda
- Class: Insecta
- Order: Diptera
- Family: Tephritidae
- Subfamily: Tephritinae
- Tribe: Tephritini
- Genus: Actinoptera
- Species: A. tientsinensis

Binomial name
- Actinoptera tientsinensis Chen, 1938

Species of fly

Actinoptera tientsinensis is a species of tephritid or fruit flies in the genus Actinoptera of the family Tephritidae.

== Distribution ==
China.
