= Goniurellia =

Scientific classification
- Kingdom: Animalia
- Phylum: Arthropoda
- Class: Insecta
- Order: Diptera
- Family: Tephritidae
- Subfamily: Tephritinae
- Tribe: Tephritini
- Genus: Goniurellia; Hendel, 1927

Type species
- Urellia tridens Hendel, 1910

Genus of flies

Goniurellia is a genus of tephritid or fruit flies in the family Tephritidae.

== Species ==
- Goniurellia apicalis Merz, 2002
- Goniurellia ebejeri Merz, 2002
- Goniurellia lacerata (Becker, 1913)
- Goniurellia longicauda Freidberg, 1980
- Goniurellia munroi Freidberg, 1980
- Goniurellia octoradiata Merz, 2002
- Goniurellia omissa Freidberg, 1980
- Goniurellia persignata Freidberg, 1980
- Goniurellia spinifera Freidberg, 1980
- Goniurellia tridens (Hendel, 1910)
