= Michotamia =

Scientific classification
- Kingdom: Animalia
- Phylum: Arthropoda
- Clade: Pancrustacea
- Class: Insecta
- Order: Diptera
- Family: Asilidae
- Genus: Michotamia; Macquart, 1838

Synonyms
- Aliocotasia Macquart, 1838; Allocotasia Macquart, 1838; Allocotosia Schiner, 1866

Genus of insects

Michotamia is a genus of robber flies. There are 24 species assigned to this genus:

- Michotamia analis Macquart, 1838
- Michotamia annulata Bigot, 1878
- Michotamia assamensis Joseph & Parui, 1995
- Michotamia aurata (Fabricius, 1794)
- Michotamia coarctata (Macquart, 1855)
- Michotamia compedita (Wiedemann, 1828)
- Michotamia deceptus Scarbrough & Hill, 2000
- Michotamia demeijerei Oldroyd, 1975
- Michotamia fuscifemorata Joseph & Parui, 1984
- Michotamia indiana Joseph & Parui, 1981
- Michotamia latifascia (Walker, 1857)
- Michotamia macquarti Joseph & Parui, 1984
- Michotamia minor (Meijere, 1911)
- Michotamia nigra (Meijere, 1911)
- Michotamia praeacuta (Wulp, 1898)
- Michotamia pruthii Joseph & Parui, 1987
- Michotamia scitula (Walker, 1859)
- Michotamia setitarsata Schiner, 1867
- Michotamia siamensis Tomasovic & Grootaert, 2003
- Michotamia singaporensis Tomasovic & Grootaert, 2008
- Michotamia subnigra Zhang, Scarbrough & Yang, 2012
- Michotamia triangulum (Wulp, 1872)
- Michotamia vulpina (Bigot, 1875)
- Michotamia yunnanensis Zhang, Scarbrough & Yang, 2012
