= Scedella =

Scientific classification
- Kingdom: Animalia
- Phylum: Arthropoda
- Class: Insecta
- Order: Diptera
- Family: Tephritidae
- Subfamily: Tephritinae
- Tribe: Tephritini
- Genus: Scedella; Munro, 1957

Type species
- Trypeta caffra Loew, 1861

Genus of flies

Scedella is a genus of tephritid or fruit flies in the family Tephritidae.

== Species ==
- Scedella basilewskyi (Munro, 1956)
- Scedella boxiana Munro, 1957
- Scedella caesia Munro, 1957
- Scedella caffra (Loew, 1861)
- Scedella cyana (Walker, 1849)
- Scedella dissoluta (Loew, 1861)
- Scedella flecta Munro, 1957
- Scedella formosella (Hendel, 1915)
- Scedella glebosa Munro, 1957
- Scedella incurva Munro, 1957
- Scedella infrequens (Hardy & Drew, 1996)
- Scedella kawandana Munro, 1957
- Scedella longiseta (Hering, 1941)
- Scedella orientalis (Meijere, 1908)
- Scedella pilosa Munro, 1957
- Scedella praetexta (Loew, 1861)
- Scedella sandoana Munro, 1957
- Scedella spatulata Munro, 1957
- Scedella spiloptera (Bezzi, 1913)
