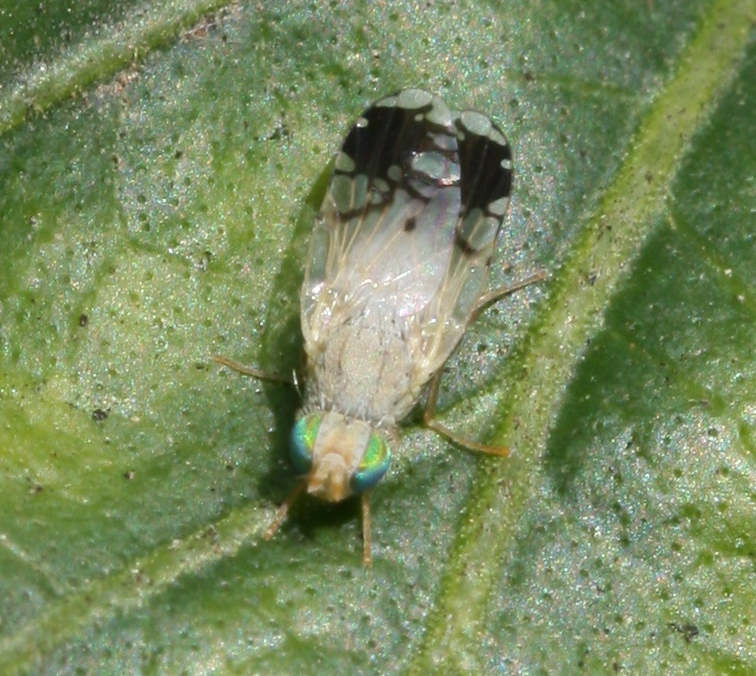
- Trupanea amoena

Scientific classification
- Kingdom: Animalia
- Phylum: Arthropoda
- Clade: Pancrustacea
- Class: Insecta
- Order: Diptera
- Family: Tephritidae
- Subfamily: Tephritinae
- Tribe: Tephritini
- Genus: Trupanea
- Species: T. amoena

Binomial name
- Trupanea amoena Frauenfeld, 1857

Synonyms
- Trypeta amoena Frauenfeld, 1857; Urellia parisiensis Robineau-Desvoidy, 1830; Trypanea amoena var. kotoshoensis Shiraki, 1933

= Trupanea amoena =

Species of fly

Trupanea amoena is a species of tephritid or fruit flies in the genus Trupanea of the family Tephritidae.

== Distribution ==
Palearctic Region, Ethiopia, India, Sri Lanka, Australia.
