= Scedella infrequens =

Scientific classification
- Kingdom: Animalia
- Phylum: Arthropoda
- Clade: Pancrustacea
- Class: Insecta
- Order: Diptera
- Family: Tephritidae
- Subfamily: Tephritinae
- Tribe: Tephritini
- Genus: Scedella
- Species: S. infrequens

Binomial name
- Scedella infrequens (Hardy & Drew, 1996)

Synonyms
- Paroxyna infrequens Hardy & Drew, 1996; Campiglossa vaga Hardy & Drew, 1996

Species of fly

Scedella infrequens is a species of tephritid or fruit flies in the genus Scedella of the family Tephritidae.

== Distribution ==
Australia.
