= Oxyaciura formosae =

Scientific classification
- Kingdom: Animalia
- Phylum: Arthropoda
- Class: Insecta
- Order: Diptera
- Family: Tephritidae
- Subfamily: Tephritinae
- Tribe: Tephrellini
- Genus: Oxyaciura
- Species: O. formosae

Binomial name
- Oxyaciura formosae (Hendel, 1915)

Synonyms
- Aciura formosae Hendel, 1915

Species of fly

Oxyaciura formosae is a species of tephritid or fruit flies in the genus Oxyaciura of the family Tephritidae.

== Distribution ==
Japan, Taiwan.
