= Scedella longiseta =

Scientific classification
- Kingdom: Animalia
- Phylum: Arthropoda
- Class: Insecta
- Order: Diptera
- Family: Tephritidae
- Subfamily: Tephritinae
- Tribe: Tephritini
- Genus: Scedella
- Species: S. longiseta

Binomial name
- Scedella longiseta (Hering, 1941)

Synonyms
- Paroxyna longiseta Hering, 1941

Species of fly

Scedella longiseta is a species of tephritid or fruit flies in the genus Scedella of the family Tephritidae.

== Distribution ==
Tanzania.
