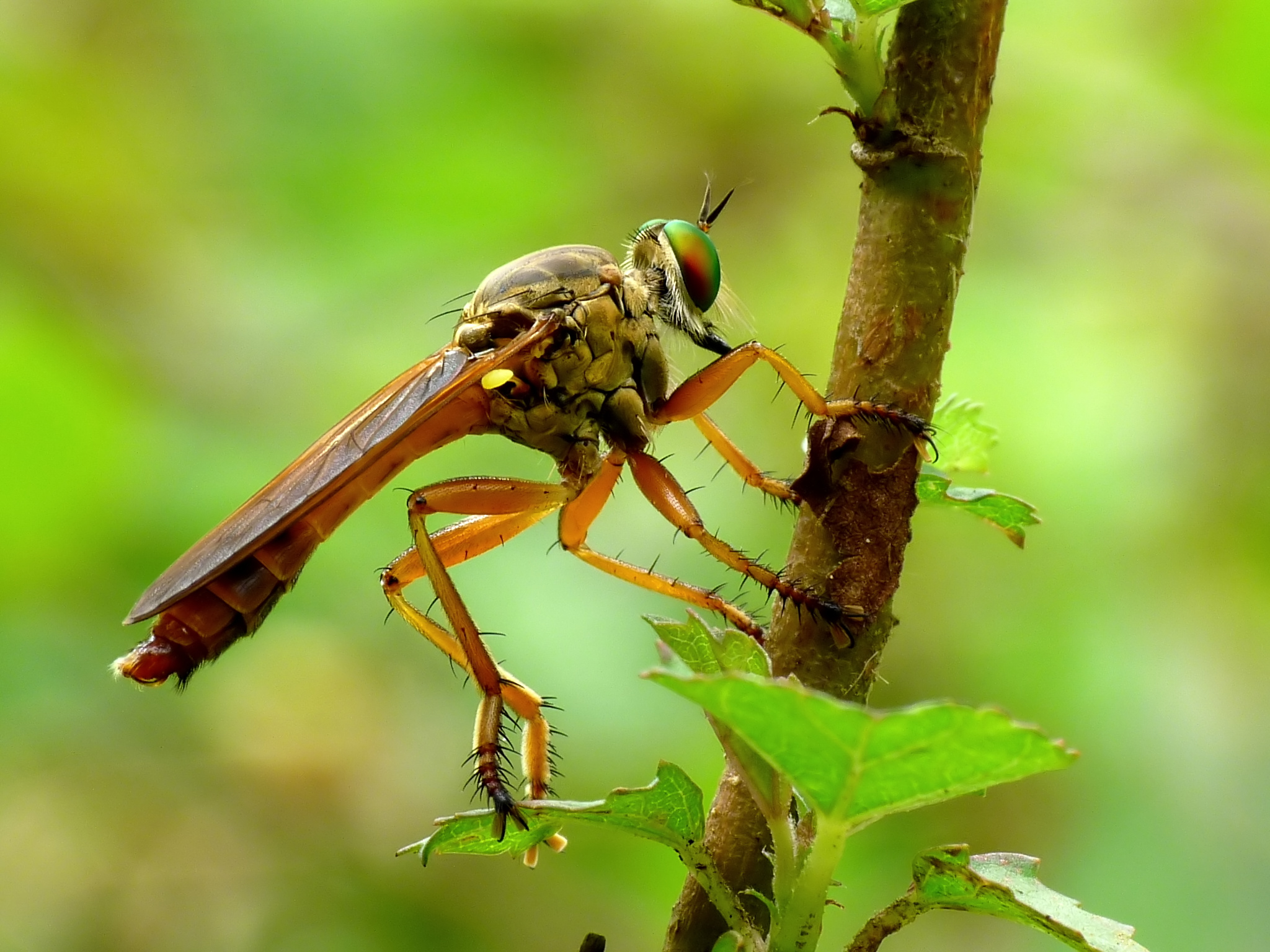

Scientific classification
- Kingdom: Animalia
- Phylum: Arthropoda
- Clade: Pancrustacea
- Class: Insecta
- Order: Diptera
- Family: Asilidae
- Genus: Michotamia
- Species: M. aurata

Binomial name
- Michotamia aurata (Fabricius, 1794)

Synonyms
- Asilus auratus Fabricius, 1794 DC; Lochites testaceus Bigot, 1878

= Michotamia aurata =

Species of insect

Michotamia aurata is a species of robber flies belonging to the family Asilidae within the order Diptera. It was first described by Johan Christian Fabricius in 1794.

== Images ==
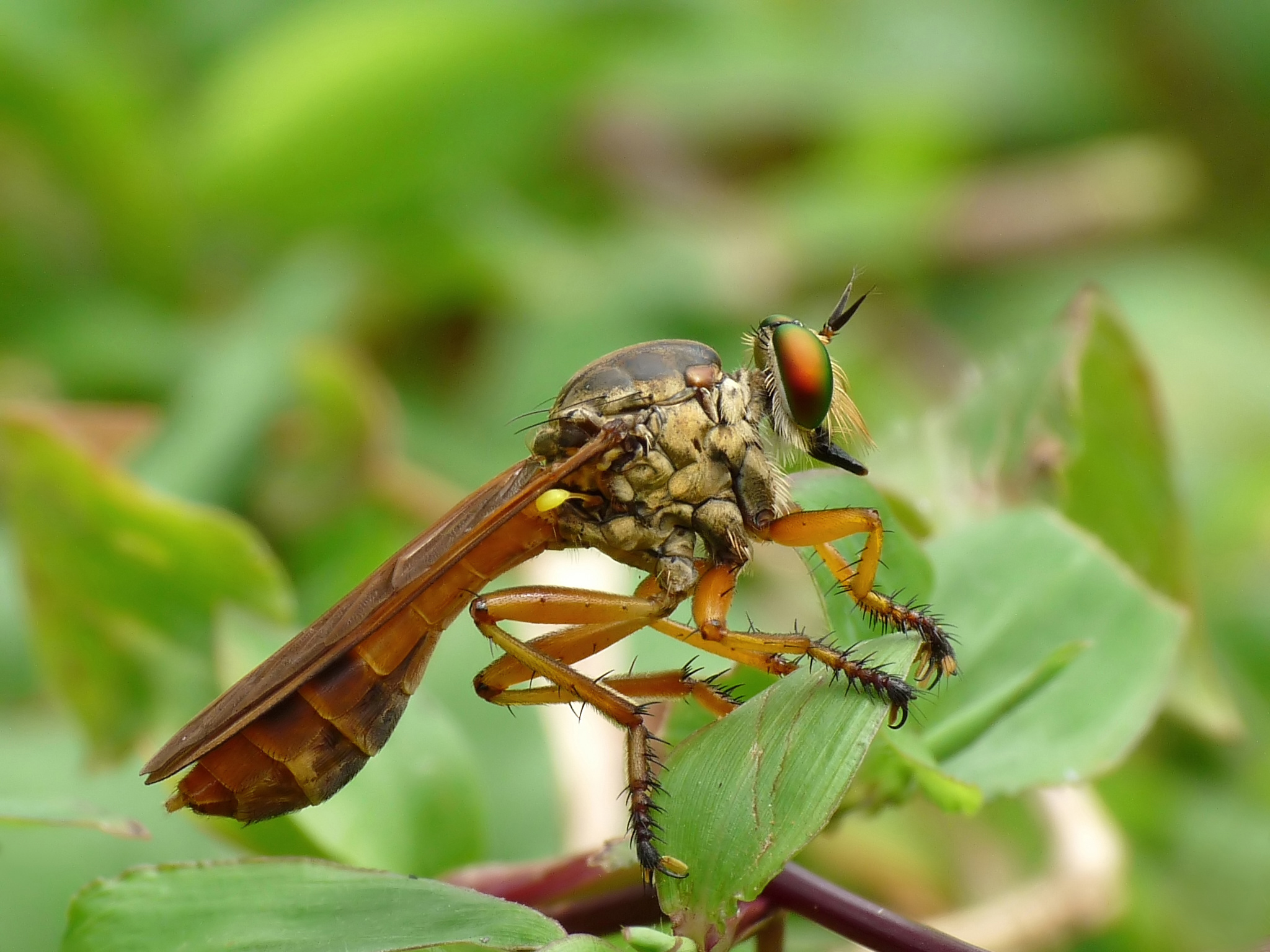

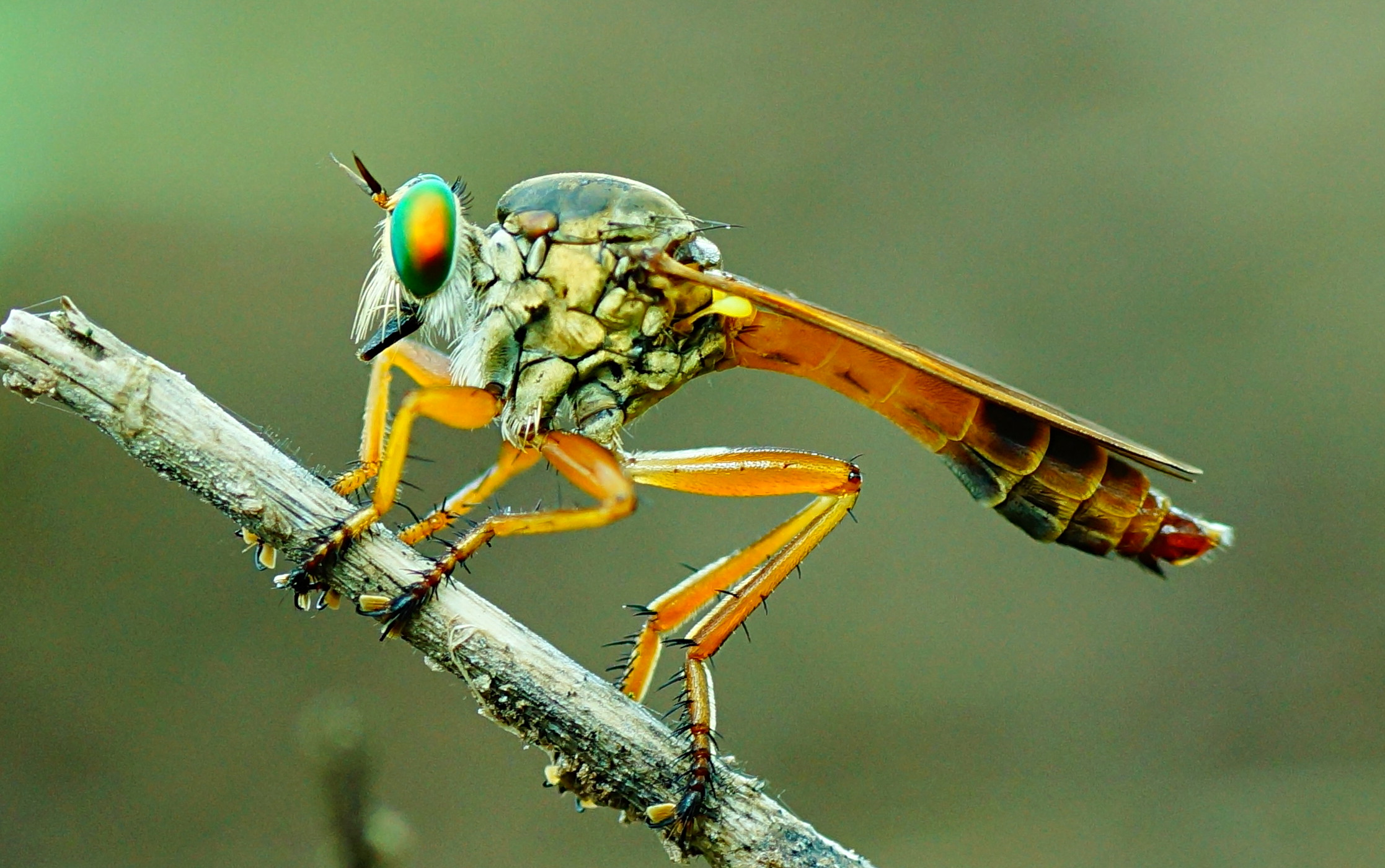

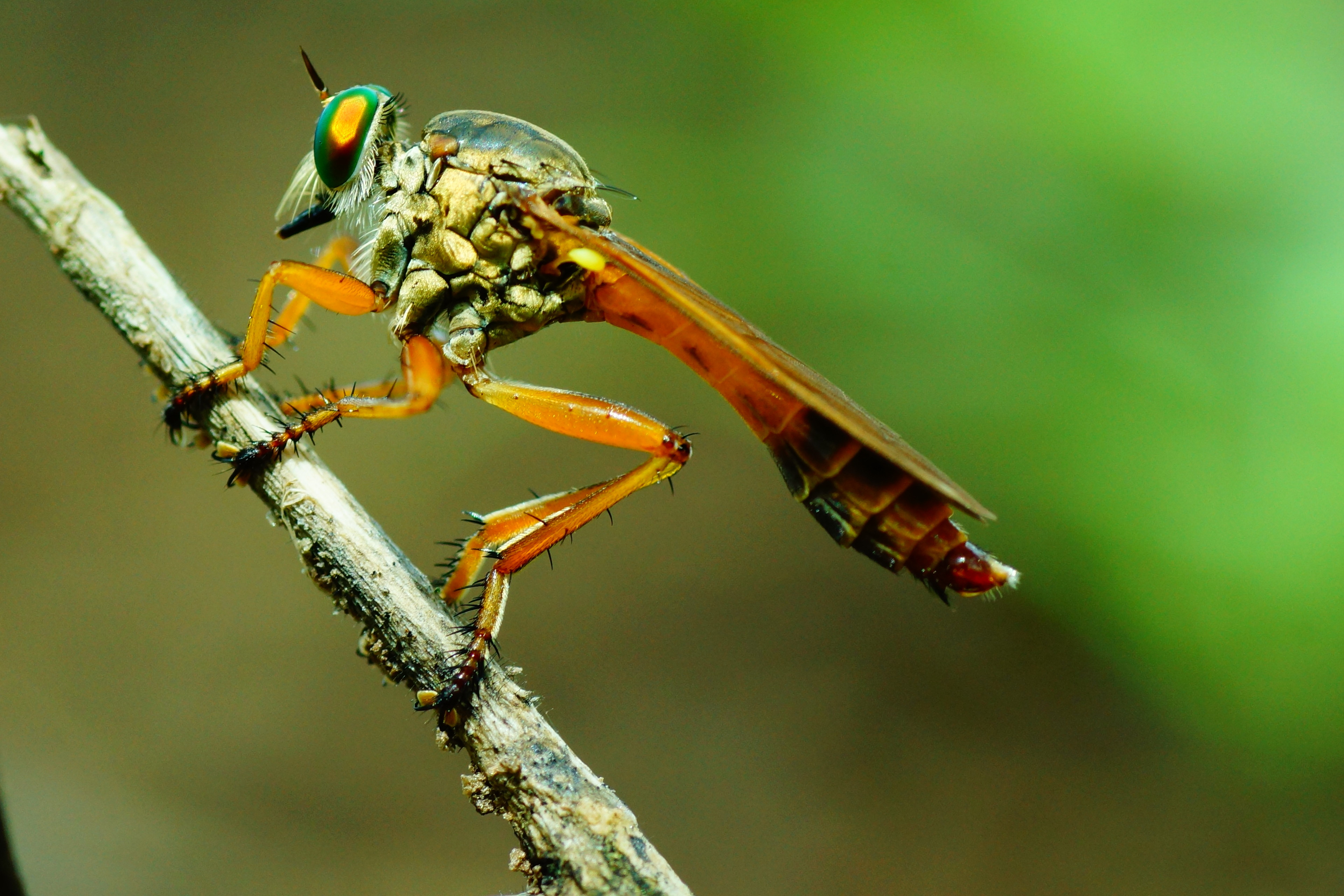
