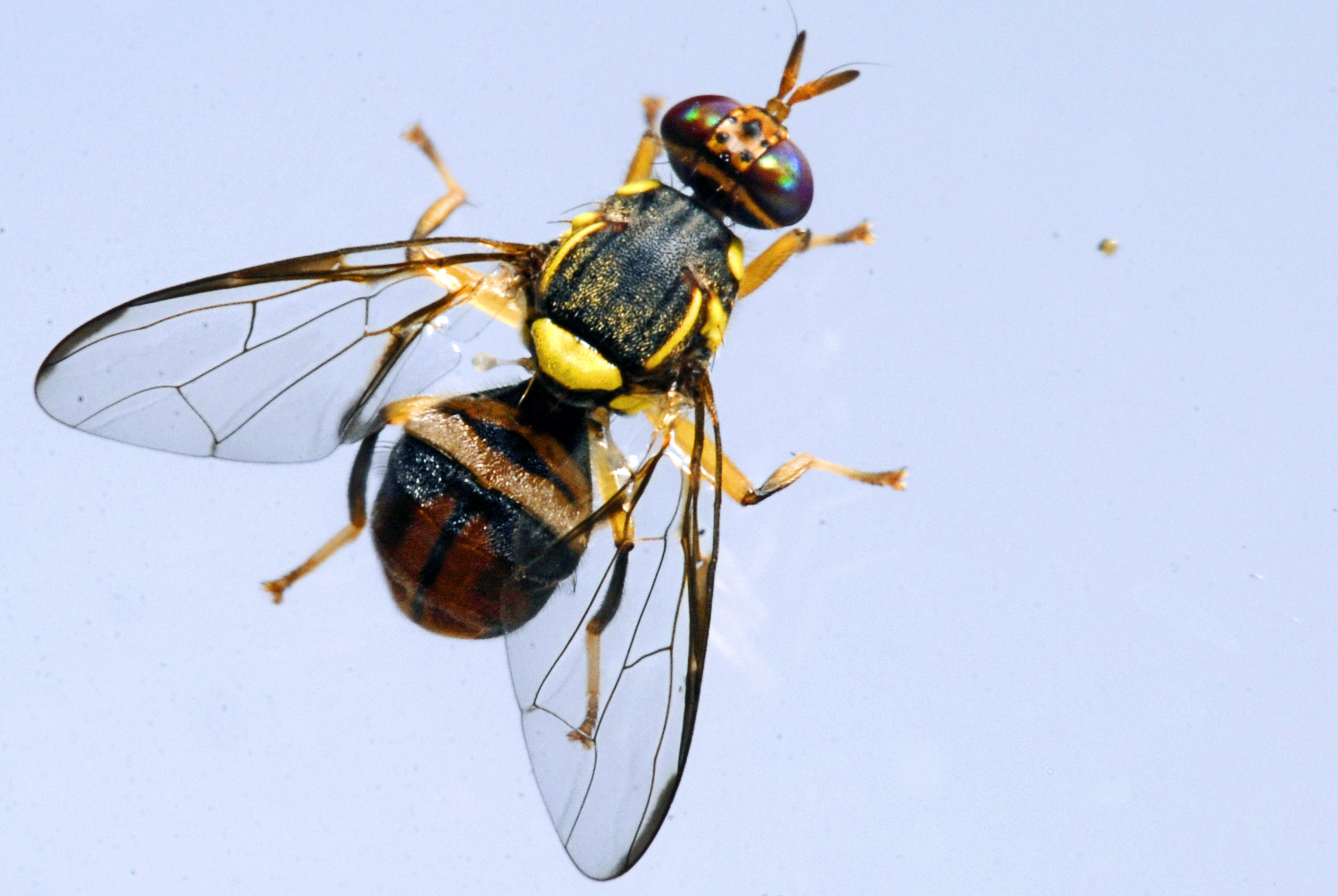

Scientific classification
- Kingdom: Animalia
- Phylum: Arthropoda
- Clade: Pancrustacea
- Class: Insecta
- Order: Diptera
- Family: Tephritidae
- Genus: Bactrocera
- Subgenus: Bactrocera
- Species: B. invadens

Binomial name
- Bactrocera invadens Drew, Tsura & White, 2005

Synonyms
- Dacus dorsalis

= Bactrocera invadens =

Species of fly

Bactrocera (Bactrocera) invadens is the name given to tephritid fruit flies that were introduced to East Africa from Sri Lanka and subsequently invaded practically the whole of Sub-Saharan Africa, hence the species name "invadens". It was first shown to be the same biological species as B. dorsalis s.s. by possessing identical sex pheromonal components after consumption of methyl eugenol, and also based on CO1 and rDNA sequences. Subsequently, it was agreed that B. invadens, B. papayae and B. philippinensis be synonymized as B. dorsalis. To counteract its detrimental effects to the fruit business, the industry resorts to cold treatment in order to get rid of the larvae.

== Description ==
- Male: Its head has a vertical length of 1.62 millimetres (0.064 in); frons length 1.36 times its breadth. The species is red-brown with fuscous around the frontal and orbital setae (which are strong and black). Its ocellar triangle is black. Its face is fulvous with a medium to large oval black spot in each antennal furrow, its length being 0.51 millimetres (0.020 in). Its thorax: scutum with a base colour being mostly dark orange-brown and black; pleural areas are dark fuscous to black with red-brown below the postpronotal lobe. The length of their wings is between 5.4 and 6.9 millimetres (0.21 and 0.27 in). Its abdomen is oval and terga free.
- Female: The female is as the male except there is no dense aggregation of microtrichia around A1+Cu2; its supernumerary lobe is weak; no pecten present on tergite III. Its oviscape is orange-brown, tending to fuscous apically, while dorsoventrally compressed and tapering posteriorly in the dorsal view. The ratio of length of oviscape to length of tergum V is 0.9:1.
