= Oxyaciura xanthotricha =

Scientific classification
- Kingdom: Animalia
- Phylum: Arthropoda
- Class: Insecta
- Order: Diptera
- Family: Tephritidae
- Subfamily: Tephritinae
- Tribe: Tephrellini
- Genus: Oxyaciura
- Species: O. xanthotricha

Binomial name
- Oxyaciura xanthotricha (Bezzi, 1913)

Synonyms
- Aciura xanthotricha Bezzi, 1913; Aciura kashmirica Zaka-ur-Rab, 1977; Pristaciura incisa Hendel, 1928

Species of fly

Oxyaciura xanthotricha is a species of tephritid or fruit flies in the genus Oxyaciura of the family Tephritidae.

== Distribution ==
India, Sri Lanka, Myanmar, Thailand, Vietnam, Indonesia.
