= Actinoptera brahma =

Scientific classification
- Kingdom: Animalia
- Phylum: Arthropoda
- Class: Insecta
- Order: Diptera
- Family: Tephritidae
- Subfamily: Tephritinae
- Tribe: Tephritini
- Genus: Actinoptera
- Species: A. brahma

Binomial name
- Actinoptera brahma (Schiner, 1868)

Synonyms
- Tephritis brahma Schiner, 1868; Actinoptera ceylanica Hering, 1941

Species of fly

Actinoptera brahma is a species of tephritid or fruit flies in the genus Actinoptera of the family Tephritidae.

== Distribution ==
India, Sri Lanka.
