= Scedella spiloptera =

Scientific classification
- Kingdom: Animalia
- Phylum: Arthropoda
- Class: Insecta
- Order: Diptera
- Family: Tephritidae
- Subfamily: Tephritinae
- Tribe: Tephritini
- Genus: Scedella
- Species: S. spiloptera

Binomial name
- Scedella spiloptera (Bezzi, 1913)

Synonyms
- Tephritis spiloptera Bezzi, 1913

Species of fly

Scedella spiloptera is a species of tephritid or fruit flies in the genus Scedella of the family Tephritidae.

== Distribution ==
India, Nepal, Sri Lanka.
