= Actinoptera formosana =

Scientific classification
- Kingdom: Animalia
- Phylum: Arthropoda
- Class: Insecta
- Order: Diptera
- Family: Tephritidae
- Subfamily: Tephritinae
- Tribe: Tephritini
- Genus: Actinoptera
- Species: A. formosana

Binomial name
- Actinoptera formosana Shiraki, 1933

Synonyms
- Actinoptera formosana Zia, 1939

Species of fly

Actinoptera formosana is a species of tephritid or fruit flies in the genus Actinoptera of the family Tephritidae.

== Distribution ==
India, Sri Lanka, Nepal, Myanmar, China, Taiwan, Philippines.
