= Oxyaciura monochaeta =

Scientific classification
- Kingdom: Animalia
- Phylum: Arthropoda
- Class: Insecta
- Order: Diptera
- Family: Tephritidae
- Subfamily: Tephritinae
- Tribe: Tephrellini
- Genus: Oxyaciura
- Species: O. monochaeta

Binomial name
- Oxyaciura monochaeta (Bezzi, 1913)

Synonyms
- Aciura monochaeta Bezzi, 1913

Species of fly

Oxyaciura monochaeta is a species of tephritid or fruit flies in the genus Oxyaciura of the family Tephritidae.

== Distribution ==
India, Nepal, Sri Lanka.
