= Scedella orientalis =

Scientific classification
- Kingdom: Animalia
- Phylum: Arthropoda
- Class: Insecta
- Order: Diptera
- Family: Tephritidae
- Subfamily: Tephritinae
- Tribe: Tephritini
- Genus: Scedella
- Species: S. orientalis

Binomial name
- Scedella orientalis (Meijere, 1908)

Synonyms
- Tephritis orientalis Meijere, 1908

Species of fly

Scedella orientalis is a species of tephritid or fruit flies in the genus Scedella of the family Tephritidae.

== Distribution ==
Sri Lanka, Vietnam, Indonesia, Australia.
