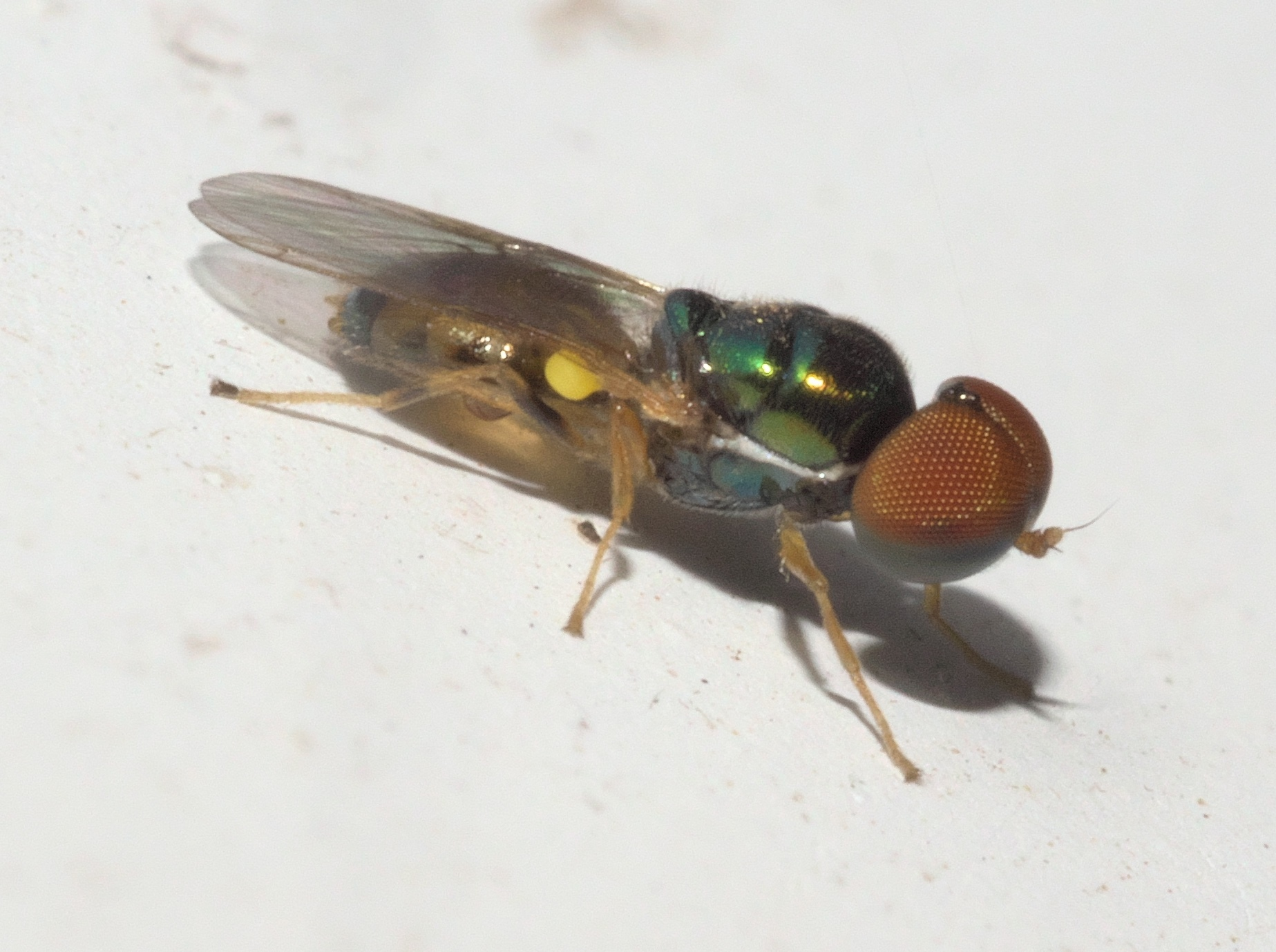
- Microchrysa flaviventris, Oklahoma

Scientific classification
- Kingdom: Animalia
- Phylum: Arthropoda
- Clade: Pancrustacea
- Class: Insecta
- Order: Diptera
- Family: Stratiomyidae
- Subfamily: Sarginae
- Genus: Microchrysa
- Species: M. flaviventris

Binomial name
- Microchrysa flaviventris (Wiedemann, 1824)

Synonyms
- Sargus affinis Wiedemann, 1824; Sargus flaviventris Wiedemann, 1824; Chrysomyia annulipes Thomson, 1869; Chrysochroma apicale Matsumura, 1916; Microchrysa gemma Bigot, 1879

= Microchrysa flaviventris =

Species of fly

Microchrysa flaviventris is a species of soldier fly in the family Stratiomyidae.
