= Actinoptera biseta =

Scientific classification
- Kingdom: Animalia
- Phylum: Arthropoda
- Class: Insecta
- Order: Diptera
- Family: Tephritidae
- Subfamily: Tephritinae
- Tribe: Tephritini
- Genus: Actinoptera
- Species: A. biseta

Binomial name
- Actinoptera biseta Hering, 1956

Species of fly

Actinoptera biseta is a species of fruit fly in the genus Actinoptera of the family Tephritidae.

== Distribution ==
Sri Lanka.
