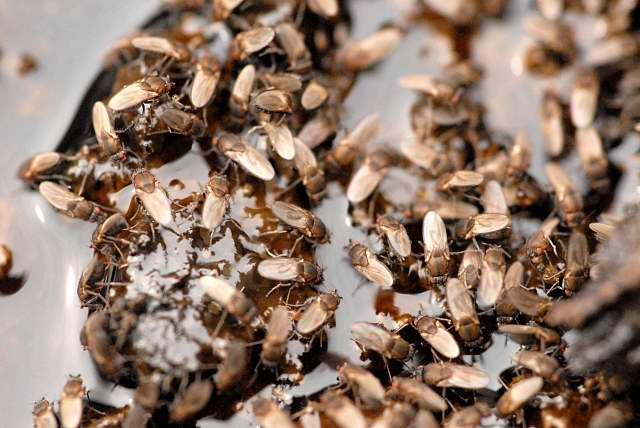

Scientific classification
- Kingdom: Animalia
- Phylum: Arthropoda
- Class: Insecta
- Order: Diptera
- Family: Sphaeroceridae
- Genus: Coproica
- Species: C. ferruginata

Binomial name
- Coproica ferruginata (Stenhammar, 1854)

Synonyms
- Borborus illotus Williston, 1896; Limosina ferruginata Stenhammar, 1854

= Coproica ferruginata =

Species of fly

Coproica ferruginata is a species of lesser dung fly in the family Sphaeroceridae. It is found in Europe.
