= Georg Ritter von Frauenfeld =

Austrian naturalist (1807–1873)

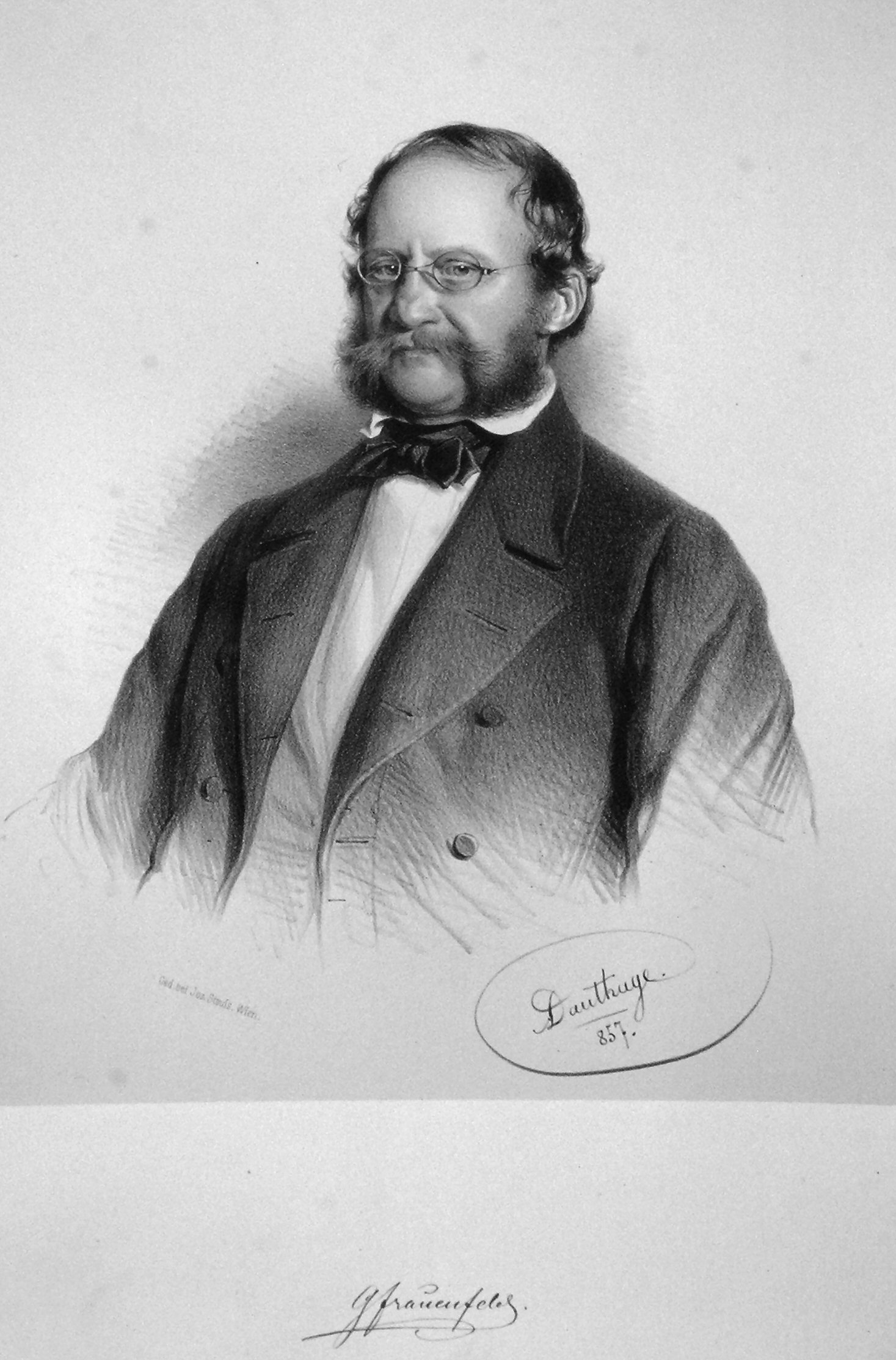
Georg von Frauenfeld, 1857

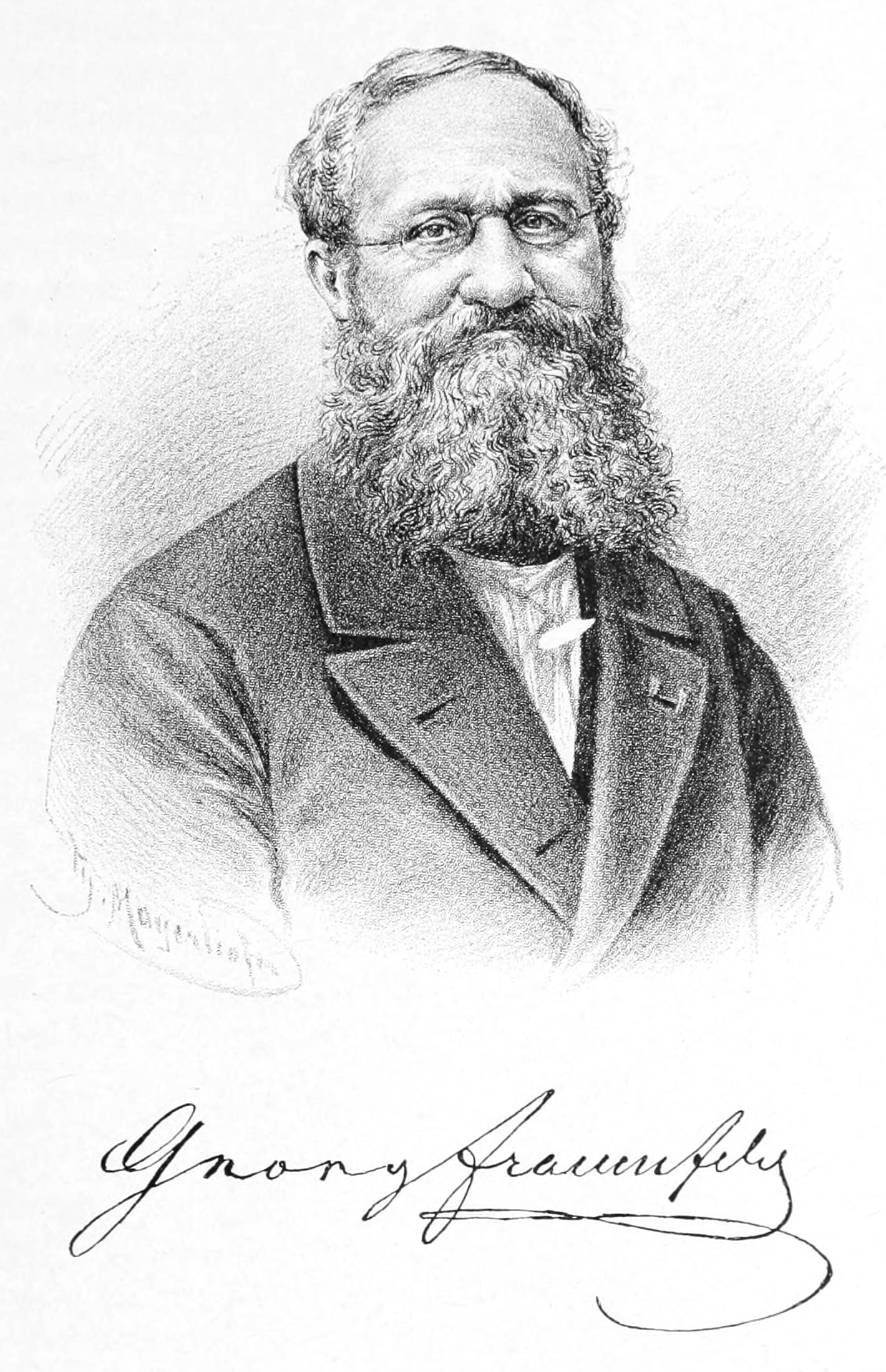
Georg von Frauenfeld

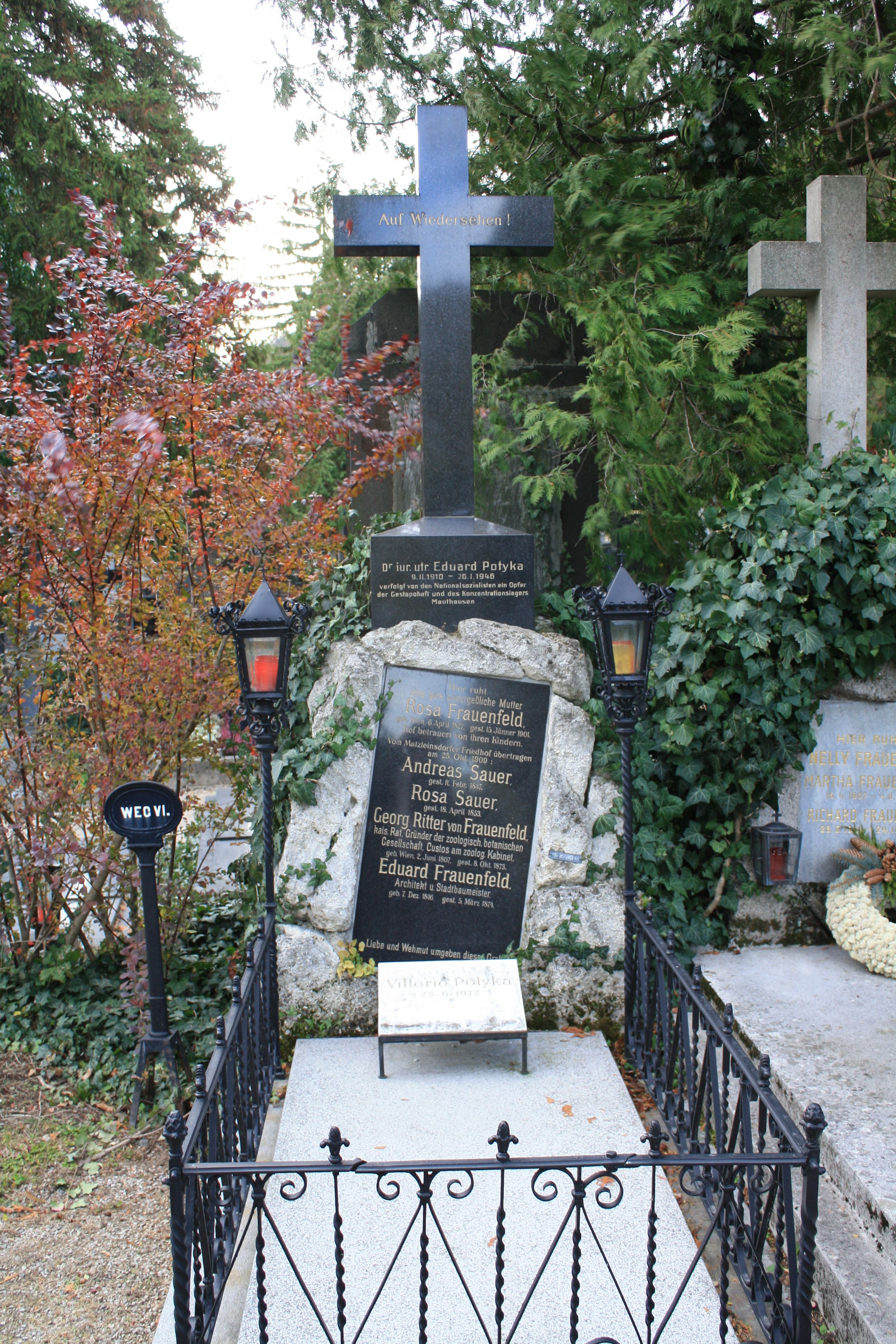
Grave from Georg von Frauenfeld in Hinterbrühl, Lower Austria

Georg Ritter von Frauenfeld (3 June 1807, Vienna – 8 October 1873) was an Austrian naturalist and one of the leading scientists on board the Austrian frigate Novara during its round-the-world voyage. He was heavily involved in the development of the Naturhistorisches Museum in Vienna, where he was a curator.

Frauenfeld worked on all insect orders, but mostly on the Diptera. In 1851 he founded, in Vienna, the Zoologisch-Botanische Verein (Zoological and Botanical Society). He was elected as a member to the American Philosophical Society in 1869.

== Works ==
- Über eine neue Fliegengattung: Raymondia, aus der Familie der Coriaceen, nebst Beschreibung zweier Arten derselben. Sitzungsber. Akad. Wiss. Wien 18: 320-33 (1855).
- Über die Paludinen aus der Gruppe der Paludina viridis Poir. - Sitzber. Akad. Wiss. mathem.-naturwiss. Classe, 22(2): 569-578, 1 Table, Vienna, 1857.
- Reise von Shanghai bis Sidney auf der k. k. Fregatte Novara, Verhandlungen des Zoologisch-Botanischen Vereins in Wien, Wien, IX, 1859, 374-82. {'Voyage from Shanghai to Sydney aboard the Imperial and Royal Frigate Novara', Proceedings of the Vienna Zoological-Botanical Society}.(1859).
- Notizen, gesammelt während meines Aufenthaltes auf Neuholland, Neuseeland and Taiti, bei der Fahrt Sr. Majestät Fregatte Novara in jenen Gewässern (Vorgetragen in der Sitzung vom 13 October 1859)', Sitzungsberichte der Mathematisch-Naturwissenschaftlichen Classe der Kaiserlichen Akademie der Wissenschaften {'Notes collected during my stay in New Holland, New Zealand and Tahiti, whilst travelling through these waters aboard His Majesty's frigate Novara (Presented at the Meeting of 13 October 1859)', Meeting Report of the Mathematical-Natural Science Section of the Imperial Academy of Science, Vienna} Acthunddreissigster Band, Jahrgang 1859, No 23 bis 28, Hof- und Staatsdruckerei, Wien, 1860, 717-32. (1860)
- Bericht über weitere Bearbeitung der Novara-Sammlungen und Fortsetzung der Diagnosen neuer Lepidopteren von Dr. Felder (1861)
- Über Scenopinus und Platypeza', Verhandlungen des Zoologisch-Botanischen Vereins in Wien {'On the Scenopinus and Platypus', Proceedings of the Vienna Zoological - Botanical Society} Wien, XIV, 1864, 65-9.(1864)
- Zoologische Miscellen. I. Verhandlungen der Zoologisch-Botanischen Gesellschaft in Wien 14: 147-158. table 5. (1864).
- Zoologische Miscellen. II. Verhandlungen der Zoologisch-Botanischen Gesellschaft in Wien 14: 379-388. (1864).
- Zoologische Miscellen. III. Verhandlungen der Zoologisch-Botanischen Gesellschaft in Wien 14: 681-696. table 20. (1864).
- Zoologische Miscellen. IV. Verhandlungen der Zoologisch-Botanischen Gesellschaft in Wien 234-266. (1965)
- Zoologische Miscellen. V. Verhandlungen der Zoologisch-Botanischen Gesellschaft in Wien 15: 525-536, tables 8-11, table 22. (1865)
- Zoologische Miscellen. VI. Verhandlungen der Zoologisch-Botanischen Gesellschaft in Wien 15: 893-902. (1865)
- Zoologische Miscellen. XI. Verhandlungen der Zoologisch-Botanischen Gesellschaft in Wien 17: 425-502.( 1867) online http://antbase.org/ants/publications/8357/8357.pdf
- Zoologische Miscellen. XV. Verhandlungen der Zoologisch-Botanischen Gesellschaft in Wien 18: 885-99. (1868)
- Eier in einem Australischen Farne', Verhandlungen des Zoologisch-Botanischen Vereins in Wien {'Eggs in an Australian Fern', Proceedings of the Vienna Zoological - Botanical Society} Wien, XIV, 1864, 383-4. (1864)

== See also ==
- European and American voyages of scientific exploration
