= Urophora hoenei =

Scientific classification
- Kingdom: Animalia
- Phylum: Arthropoda
- Class: Insecta
- Order: Diptera
- Family: Tephritidae
- Subfamily: Tephritinae
- Tribe: Myopitini
- Genus: Urophora
- Species: U. hoenei

Binomial name
- Urophora hoenei (Hering, 1936)

Synonyms
- Euribia honei Hering, 1936; Euribia hoenei Hering, 1936; Euribia bicoloricornis Zia, 1937; Urophora honei Foote, 1984

Species of fly

Urophora hoenei is a species of tephritid or fruit flies in the genus Urophora of the family Tephritidae.

== Distribution ==
China.
