= Rhynencina spilogaster =

Scientific classification
- Kingdom: Animalia
- Phylum: Arthropoda
- Class: Insecta
- Order: Diptera
- Family: Tephritidae
- Subfamily: Tephritinae
- Tribe: Myopitini
- Genus: Rhynencina
- Species: R. spilogaster

Binomial name
- Rhynencina spilogaster (Steyskal, 1979)

Synonyms
- Urophora spilogaster Steyskal, 1979

Species of fly

Rhynencina spilogaster is a species of tephritid or fruit flies in the genus Rhynencina of the family Tephritidae.

== Distribution ==
Mexico, Guatemala, Honduras.
