= Rhynencina dysphanes =

Scientific classification
- Kingdom: Animalia
- Phylum: Arthropoda
- Class: Insecta
- Order: Diptera
- Family: Tephritidae
- Subfamily: Tephritinae
- Tribe: Myopitini
- Genus: Rhynencina
- Species: R. dysphanes

Binomial name
- Rhynencina dysphanes (Steyskal, 1979)

Synonyms
- Urophora dysphanes Steyskal, 1979

Species of fly

Rhynencina dysphanes is a species of tephritid or fruit flies in the genus Rhynencina of the family Tephritidae.

== Distribution ==
Colombia, Ecuador.
