= Neomyopites adjacens =

Scientific classification
- Kingdom: Animalia
- Phylum: Arthropoda
- Class: Insecta
- Order: Diptera
- Family: Tephritidae
- Genus: Neomyopites
- Species: N. adjacens

Binomial name
- Neomyopites adjacens

Synonyms
- Urophora adjacens

Species of fly

Neomyopites adjacens is a species of tephritid or fruit flies in the genus Urophora of the family Tephritidae.
