= Dictya sabroskyi =

Scientific classification
- Kingdom: Animalia
- Phylum: Arthropoda
- Class: Insecta
- Order: Diptera
- Family: Sciomyzidae
- Genus: Dictya
- Species: D. sabroskyi

Binomial name
- Dictya sabroskyi Steyskal, 1938

Species of fly

Dictya sabroskyi is a species of marsh fly in the family Sciomyzidae.
