= Urophora maura =

Scientific classification
- Kingdom: Animalia
- Phylum: Arthropoda
- Class: Insecta
- Order: Diptera
- Family: Tephritidae
- Genus: Urophora
- Species: U. maura

Binomial name
- Urophora maura (Frauenfeld, 1857)

Species of insect

Urophora maura is a species of tephritid or fruit flies in the genus Urophora of the family Tephritidae.
