= Myopitora shatalkini =

Scientific classification
- Kingdom: Animalia
- Phylum: Arthropoda
- Class: Insecta
- Order: Diptera
- Family: Tephritidae
- Subfamily: Tephritinae
- Tribe: Myopitini
- Genus: Myopitora
- Species: M. shatalkini

Binomial name
- Myopitora shatalkini Korneyev & White, 1991

Species of fly

Myopitora shatalkini is a species of tephritid or fruit flies in the genus Myopitora of the family Tephritidae.

== Distribution ==
The species can be found in Russia.
