= Urophora sirunaseva =

Scientific classification
- Kingdom: Animalia
- Phylum: Arthropoda
- Class: Insecta
- Order: Diptera
- Family: Tephritidae
- Subfamily: Tephritinae
- Tribe: Myopitini
- Genus: Urophora
- Species: U. sirunaseva

Binomial name
- Urophora sirunaseva (Hering, 1938)

Synonyms
- Euribia sirunaseva Hering, 1938

Species of fly

Urophora sirunaseva is a species of tephritid or fruit flies in the genus Urophora of the family Tephritidae.

== Distribution ==
Greece, Turkey, Moldova, Ukraine, Israel; introduced to North America
