= Dyseuaresta caracasana =

Scientific classification
- Kingdom: Animalia
- Phylum: Arthropoda
- Class: Insecta
- Order: Diptera
- Family: Tephritidae
- Subfamily: Tephritinae
- Tribe: Tephritini
- Genus: Dyseuaresta
- Species: D. caracasana

Binomial name
- Dyseuaresta caracasana (Foote, 1980)

Synonyms
- Trupanea caracasana Foote, 1980

Species of fly

Dyseuaresta caracasana is a species of tephritid or fruit flies in the family Tephritidae.

== Distribution ==
Venezuela.
