= Urophora impicta =

Scientific classification
- Kingdom: Animalia
- Phylum: Arthropoda
- Class: Insecta
- Order: Diptera
- Family: Tephritidae
- Subfamily: Tephritinae
- Tribe: Myopitini
- Genus: Urophora
- Species: U. impicta

Binomial name
- Urophora impicta (Hendel, 1914)

Synonyms
- Euribia impicta Hendel, 1914

Species of fly

Urophora impicta is a species of tephritid or fruit flies in the genus Urophora of the family Tephritidae.

== Distribution ==
Russia, Turkmenistan, Afghanistan.
