= Urophora mauritanica =

Scientific classification
- Kingdom: Animalia
- Phylum: Arthropoda
- Class: Insecta
- Order: Diptera
- Family: Tephritidae
- Subfamily: Tephritinae
- Tribe: Myopitini
- Genus: Urophora
- Species: U. mauritanica

Binomial name
- Urophora mauritanica Macquart, 1851

Synonyms
- Urophora algira Macquart, 1843; Trypeta macrura Loew, 1855; Urophora lejura Rondani, 1870; Urophora sejuncta Becker, 1907

Species of fly

Urophora mauritanica is a species of tephritid or fruit flies in the genus Urophora of the family Tephritidae.

== Distribution ==
Spain & Morocco to Israel.
