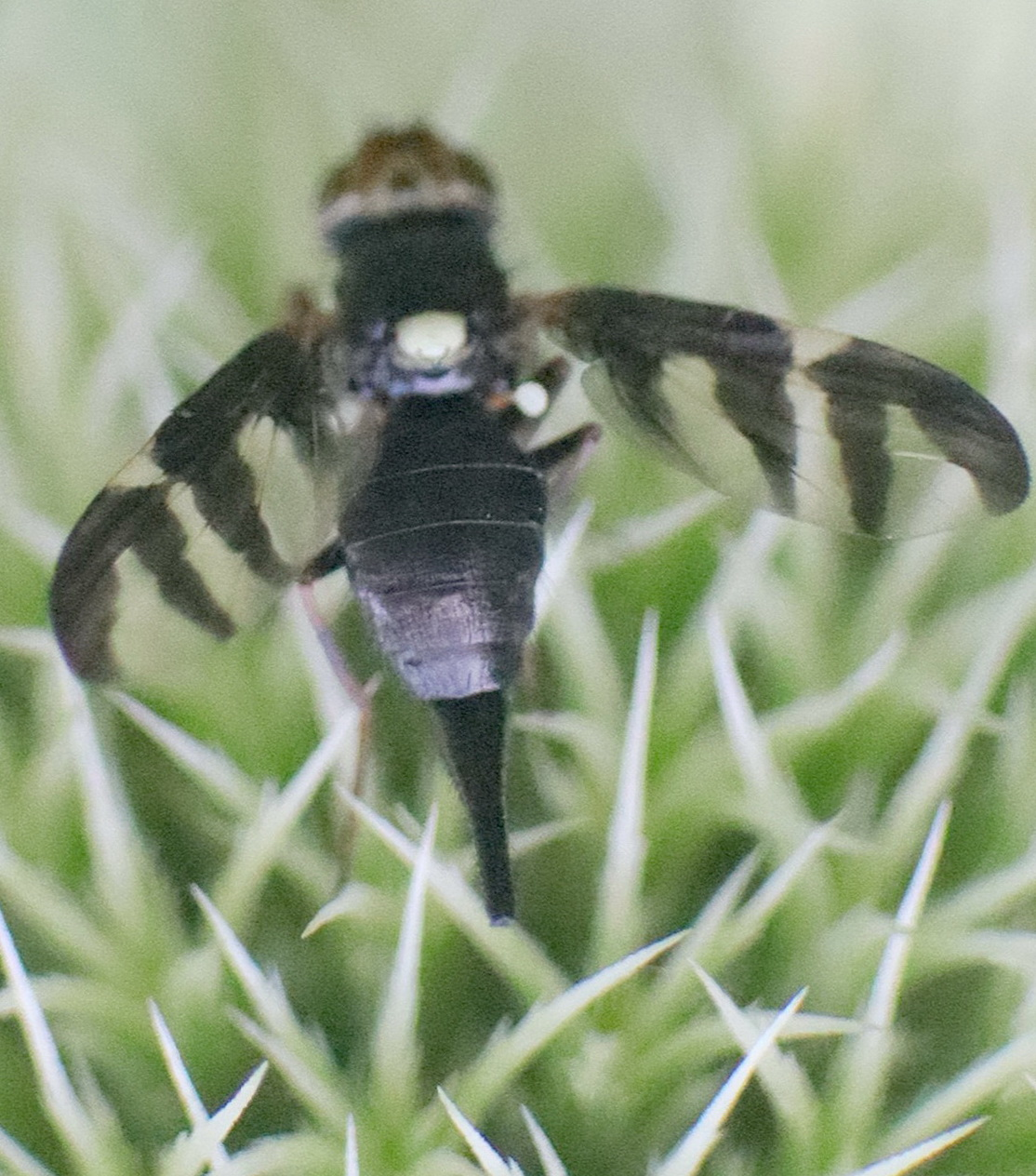
- Urophora dzieduszyckii

Scientific classification
- Kingdom: Animalia
- Phylum: Arthropoda
- Clade: Pancrustacea
- Class: Insecta
- Order: Diptera
- Family: Tephritidae
- Subfamily: Tephritinae
- Tribe: Myopitini
- Genus: Urophora
- Species: U. dzieduszyckii

Binomial name
- Urophora dzieduszyckii Frauenfeld, 1867

Synonyms
- Urophora wodzizkii Frauenfeld, 1867

= Urophora dzieduszyckii =

Species of fly

Urophora dzieduszyckii is a species of tephritid or fruit flies in the genus Urophora of the family Tephritidae.

== Distribution ==
Ukraine.
