= Urophora stigma =

Scientific classification
- Kingdom: Animalia
- Phylum: Arthropoda
- Class: Insecta
- Order: Diptera
- Family: Tephritidae
- Subfamily: Tephritinae
- Tribe: Myopitini
- Genus: Urophora
- Species: U. stigma

Binomial name
- Urophora stigma (Loew, 1840)

Synonyms
- Trypeta stigma Loew, 1840; Trypeta unimaculata Roser, 1840

Species of fly

Urophora stigma is a species of tephritid or fruit flies in the genus Urophora of the family Tephritidae.

== Distribution ==
Sweden & Northwest Russia France, Hungary, Turkmenistan & Kirghizia.
