= Dictya atlantica =

Scientific classification
- Domain: Eukaryota
- Kingdom: Animalia
- Phylum: Arthropoda
- Class: Insecta
- Order: Diptera
- Family: Sciomyzidae
- Genus: Dictya
- Species: D. atlantica

Binomial name
- Dictya atlantica Steyskal, 1954

Species of fly

Dictya atlantica is a species of marsh fly in the family Sciomyzidae.
