= Urophora algerica =

Scientific classification
- Kingdom: Animalia
- Phylum: Arthropoda
- Class: Insecta
- Order: Diptera
- Family: Tephritidae
- Subfamily: Tephritinae
- Tribe: Myopitini
- Genus: Urophora
- Species: U. algerica

Binomial name
- Urophora algerica (Hering, 1941)

Synonyms
- Euribia algerica Hering, 1941

Species of fly

Urophora algerica is a species of tephritid or fruit flies in the genus Urophora of the family Tephritidae.

== Distribution ==
France, Spain, Italy, Algeria.
