= Urophora spoliata =

Scientific classification
- Kingdom: Animalia
- Phylum: Arthropoda
- Class: Insecta
- Order: Diptera
- Family: Tephritidae
- Subfamily: Tephritinae
- Tribe: Myopitini
- Genus: Urophora
- Species: U. spoliata

Binomial name
- Urophora spoliata (Haliday, 1838)

Synonyms
- Tephritis spoliata Haliday, 1838

Species of fly

Urophora spoliata is a species of tephritid or fruit flies in the genus Urophora of the family Tephritidae.

== Distribution ==
Britain, Slovakia, Hungary, Switzerland
