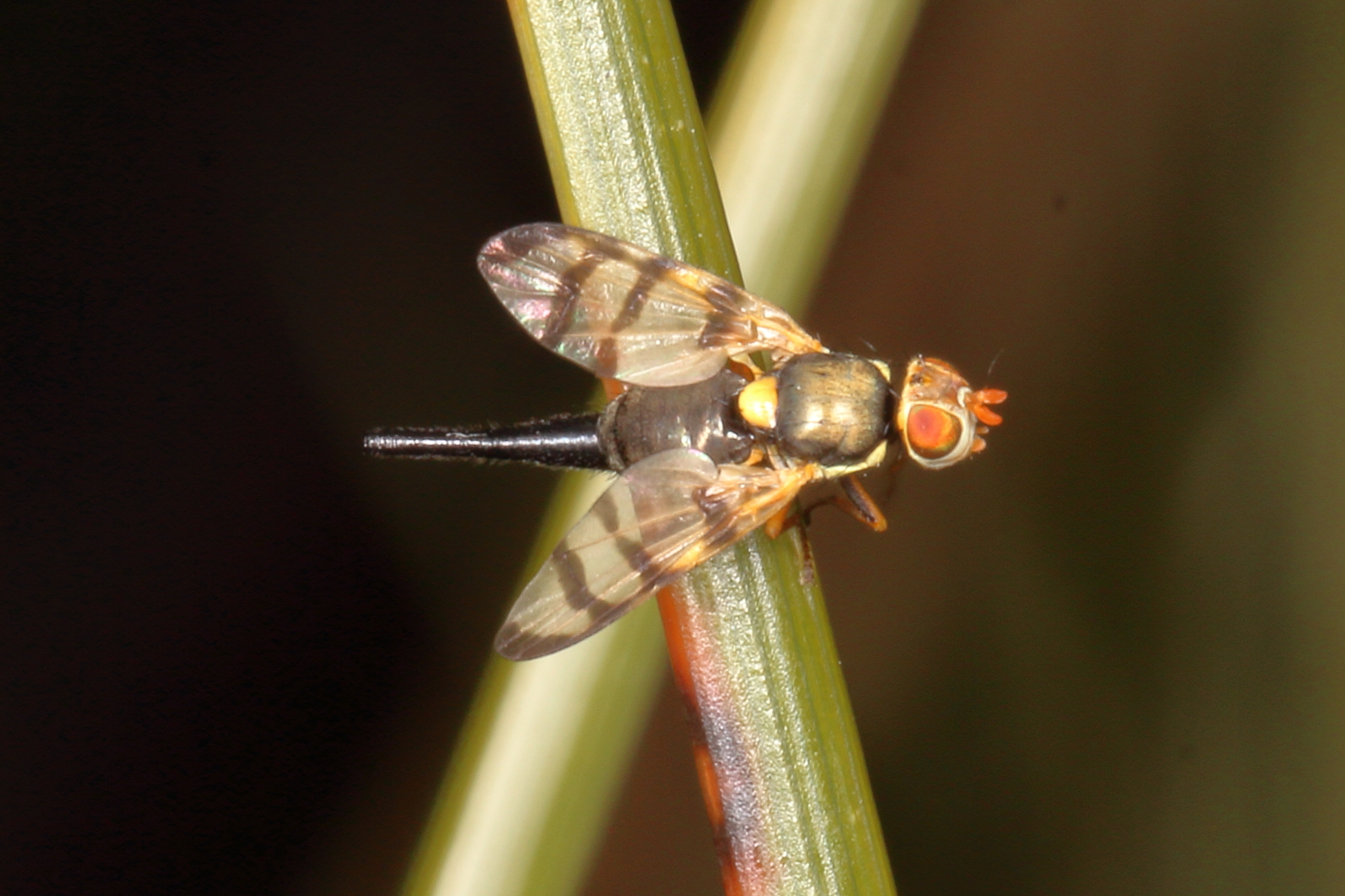

Scientific classification
- Kingdom: Animalia
- Phylum: Arthropoda
- Class: Insecta
- Order: Diptera
- Family: Tephritidae
- Subfamily: Tephritinae
- Tribe: Myopitini
- Genus: Urophora
- Species: U. solstitialis

Binomial name
- Urophora solstitialis (Linnaeus, 1758)

Synonyms
- Musca solstitialis Linnaeus, 1758; Musca arctii De Geer, 1776; Musca dauci Fabricius, 1787; Dacus hastatus Fabricius, 1805; Trypeta pugionata Meigen, 1826; Urophora femoralis Robineau-Desvoidy, 1830; Urophora veruata Rondani, 1870; Urophora sibynata Rondani, 1870; Euribia sonderupi Hering, 1940

= Urophora solstitialis =

Species of fly

Urophora solstitialis is a species of tephritid or fruit flies in the genus Urophora of the family Tephritidae.

== Distribution ==
Britain, Scandinavia & Kazakhstan France, Italy, Balkans & Iran; Introduced to North America, Australia, New Zealand
