= Inuromaesa sogdiana =

Scientific classification
- Kingdom: Animalia
- Phylum: Arthropoda
- Class: Insecta
- Order: Diptera
- Family: Tephritidae
- Genus: Inuromaesa
- Species: I. sogdiana

Binomial name
- Inuromaesa sogdiana

Species of fly

Inuromaesa sogdiana is a species of tephritid, or fruit flies, in the genus Inuromaesa of the family Tephritidae.
