= U. formosa =

U. formosa may refer to:

- Uluella formosa, a jumping spider
- Urophora formosa, a fruit fly
