= Stamnophora vernoniicola =

Scientific classification
- Kingdom: Animalia
- Phylum: Arthropoda
- Class: Insecta
- Order: Diptera
- Family: Tephritidae
- Subfamily: Tephritinae
- Tribe: Myopitini
- Genus: Stamnophora
- Species: S. vernoniicola

Binomial name
- Stamnophora vernoniicola Bezzi, 1920

Synonyms
- Tephritis vernoniicola Bezzi, 1920

Species of fly

Stamnophora vernoniicola is a species of tephritid or fruit flies in the genus Stamnophora of the family Tephritidae.

== Distribution ==
Eritrea, Kenya, Uganda, Malawi, South Africa.
