= Urophora mandschurica =

Scientific classification
- Kingdom: Animalia
- Phylum: Arthropoda
- Class: Insecta
- Order: Diptera
- Family: Tephritidae
- Subfamily: Tephritinae
- Tribe: Myopitini
- Genus: Urophora
- Species: U. mandschurica

Binomial name
- Urophora mandschurica (Hering, 1940)

Synonyms
- Euribia mandschurica Hering, 1940

Species of fly

Urophora mandschurica is a species of tephritid or fruit flies in the genus Urophora of the family Tephritidae.

== Distribution ==
Russia, Mongolia, China.
