= Urophora spatiosa =

Scientific classification
- Kingdom: Animalia
- Phylum: Arthropoda
- Class: Insecta
- Order: Diptera
- Family: Tephritidae
- Subfamily: Tephritinae
- Tribe: Myopitini
- Genus: Urophora
- Species: U. spatiosa

Binomial name
- Urophora spatiosa (Becker, 1913)

Synonyms
- Euribia spatiosa Becker, 1913

Species of fly

Urophora spatiosa is a species of tephritid or fruit flies in the genus Urophora of the family Tephritidae.

== Distribution ==
Iran, Uzbekistan
