= Urophora repeteki =

Scientific classification
- Kingdom: Animalia
- Phylum: Arthropoda
- Class: Insecta
- Order: Diptera
- Family: Tephritidae
- Subfamily: Tephritinae
- Tribe: Myopitini
- Genus: Urophora
- Species: U. repeteki

Binomial name
- Urophora repeteki (Munro, 1934)

Synonyms
- Euribia repeteki Munro, 1934

Species of flies

Urophora repeteki is a species of fruit fly in the family Tephritidae.

== Distribution ==
Cyprus, Turkey & Kazakhstan to Israel, Iran & Afghanistan.
