= U. mexicana =

U. mexicana may refer to:

- Ulmus mexicana, the Mexican elm, a large deciduous tree species endemic to Mexico and Central America
- Urophora mexicana, a fruit fly species

== See also ==
- Mexicana (disambiguation)
