= Urophora sachalinensis =

Scientific classification
- Kingdom: Animalia
- Phylum: Arthropoda
- Class: Insecta
- Order: Diptera
- Family: Tephritidae
- Subfamily: Tephritinae
- Tribe: Myopitini
- Genus: Urophora
- Species: U. sachalinensis

Binomial name
- Urophora sachalinensis (Shiraki, 1933)

Synonyms
- Euribia sachalinensis Shiraki, 1933

Species of fly

Urophora sachalinensis is a species of tephritid or fruit flies in the genus Urophora of the family Tephritidae.

== Distribution ==
Japan, Russia.
