= Urophora stalker =

Scientific classification
- Kingdom: Animalia
- Phylum: Arthropoda
- Class: Insecta
- Order: Diptera
- Family: Tephritidae
- Subfamily: Tephritinae
- Tribe: Myopitini
- Genus: Urophora
- Species: U. stalker

Binomial name
- Urophora stalker Korneyev, 1984

Synonyms
- Urophora beikoi Korneyev, 1985

Species of fly

Urophora stalker is a species of tephritid or fruit flies in the genus Urophora of the family Tephritidae.

== Distribution ==
Kazakhstan, Turkmenistan, Uzbekistan, Tajikistan.
