= Urophora formosana =

Scientific classification
- Kingdom: Animalia
- Phylum: Arthropoda
- Class: Insecta
- Order: Diptera
- Family: Tephritidae
- Subfamily: Tephritinae
- Tribe: Myopitini
- Genus: Urophora
- Species: U. formosana

Binomial name
- Urophora formosana (Shiraki, 1933)

Synonyms
- Euribia formosana Shiraki, 1933

Species of fly

Urophora formosana is a species of fruit fly in the genus Urophora of the family Tephritidae, which lives in Taiwan.
