= T. cuspidata =

T. cuspidata may refer to:

- Taxus cuspidata, the Japanese yew or spreading yew, a tree species native to Japan, Korea, northeast China and the extreme southeast of Russia
- Trypeta cuspidata, a fruit fly species

== See also ==
- Cuspidata (disambiguation)
