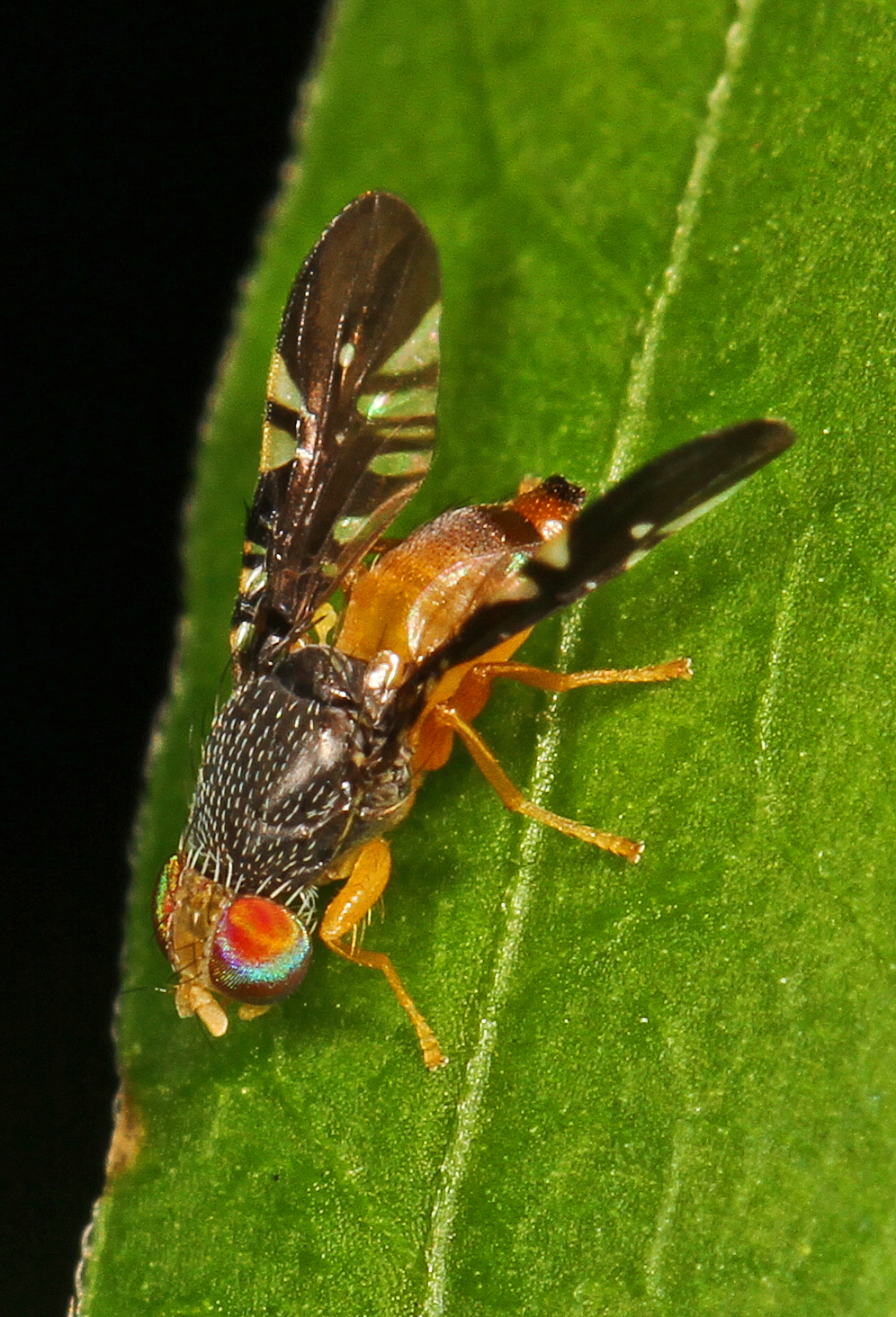
- Xanthaciura sp.

Scientific classification
- Kingdom: Animalia
- Phylum: Arthropoda
- Class: Insecta
- Order: Diptera
- Family: Tephritidae
- Subfamily: Tephritinae
- Tribe: Tephritini
- Genus: Xanthaciura; Hendel, 1914

Type species
- Trypeta chrysura Thomson, 1869

Synonyms
- Chrysaciura Aczél, 1953; Eucosmoptera Phillips, 1923; Tetraciura Hendel, 1914

= Xanthaciura =

Genus of flies

Xanthaciura is a genus of tephritid or fruit flies in the family Tephritidae.

== Species ==
- Xanthaciura aczeli Foote, 1982
- Xanthaciura biocellata (Thomson, 1869)
- Xanthaciura bipuncta (Aczél, 1953)
- Xanthaciura chrysura (Thomson, 1869)
- Xanthaciura connexionis Benjamin, 1934
- Xanthaciura excelsa Aczél, 1950
- Xanthaciura flavicauda Aczél, 1953
- Xanthaciura insecta (Loew, 1862)
- Xanthaciura major Malloch, 1934
- Xanthaciura mallochi Aczél, 1950
- Xanthaciura phoenicura (Loew, 1873)
- Xanthaciura quadrisetosa (Hendel, 1914)
- Xanthaciura speciosa Hendel, 1914
- Xanthaciura stonei Aczél, 1953
- Xanthaciura tetraspina (Phillips, 1923)
- Xanthaciura thetis Hendel, 1914
- Xanthaciura unipuncta Malloch, 1933
