= Tephritomyia lauta =

Scientific classification
- Kingdom: Animalia
- Phylum: Arthropoda
- Class: Insecta
- Order: Diptera
- Family: Tephritidae
- Subfamily: Tephritinae
- Tribe: Tephritini
- Genus: Tephritomyia
- Species: T. lauta

Binomial name
- Tephritomyia lauta Loew, 1869

Synonyms
- Oxyna lauta Loew, 1869; Tephritomyia velifera Foote, 1984; Tephritis veliformis Becker, 1907

Species of fly

Tephritomyia lauta is a species of tephritid or fruit flies in the genus Tephritomyia of the family Tephritidae.

== Distribution ==
Greece, Israel, Iran, Tunisia, Egypt.
