= Urophora agnata =

Scientific classification
- Kingdom: Animalia
- Phylum: Arthropoda
- Class: Insecta
- Order: Diptera
- Family: Tephritidae
- Subfamily: Tephritinae
- Tribe: Myopitini
- Genus: Urophora
- Species: U. agnata

Binomial name
- Urophora agnata (Hendel, 1914)

Synonyms
- Euribia agnata Hendel, 1914

Species of fly

Urophora agnata, also called Euribia agnata in other literature, is a species of tephritid or fruit flies in the genus Urophora of the family Tephritidae.

== Distribution ==
Colombia.
