= Urophora misakiana =

Scientific classification
- Kingdom: Animalia
- Phylum: Arthropoda
- Class: Insecta
- Order: Diptera
- Family: Tephritidae
- Subfamily: Tephritinae
- Tribe: Myopitini
- Genus: Urophora
- Species: U. misakiana

Binomial name
- Urophora misakiana (Matsumura, 1916)

Synonyms
- Trypeta misakiana Matsumura, 1916

Species of fly

Urophora misakiana is a species of tephritid or fruit flies in the genus Urophora of the family Tephritidae.

== Distribution ==
Japan.
