= T. aprica =

T. aprica may refer to:

- Tarache aprica, a moth species
- Townsendia aprica, a flowering plant species
- Trypeta aprica, a fruit fly species
