= Urophora rufipes =

Scientific classification
- Kingdom: Animalia
- Phylum: Arthropoda
- Class: Insecta
- Order: Diptera
- Family: Tephritidae
- Subfamily: Tephritinae
- Tribe: Myopitini
- Genus: Urophora
- Species: U. rufipes

Binomial name
- Urophora rufipes (Curran, 1932)

Synonyms
- Aleomyia rufipes Curran, 1932

Species of flies

Urophora rufipes is a species of fruit fly in the family Tephritidae.

== Distribution ==
United States.
