= Urophora tenuior =

Scientific classification
- Kingdom: Animalia
- Phylum: Arthropoda
- Class: Insecta
- Order: Diptera
- Family: Tephritidae
- Subfamily: Tephritinae
- Tribe: Myopitini
- Genus: Urophora
- Species: U. tenuior

Binomial name
- Urophora tenuior Hendel, 1910

Synonyms
- Euribia attingens Munro, 1934; Euribia heratensis Dirlbek & Dirlbek, 1968

Species of fly

Urophora tenuior is a species of tephritid or fruit flies in the genus Urophora of the family Tephritidae.

== Distribution ==
Turkmenistan, Afghanistan.
