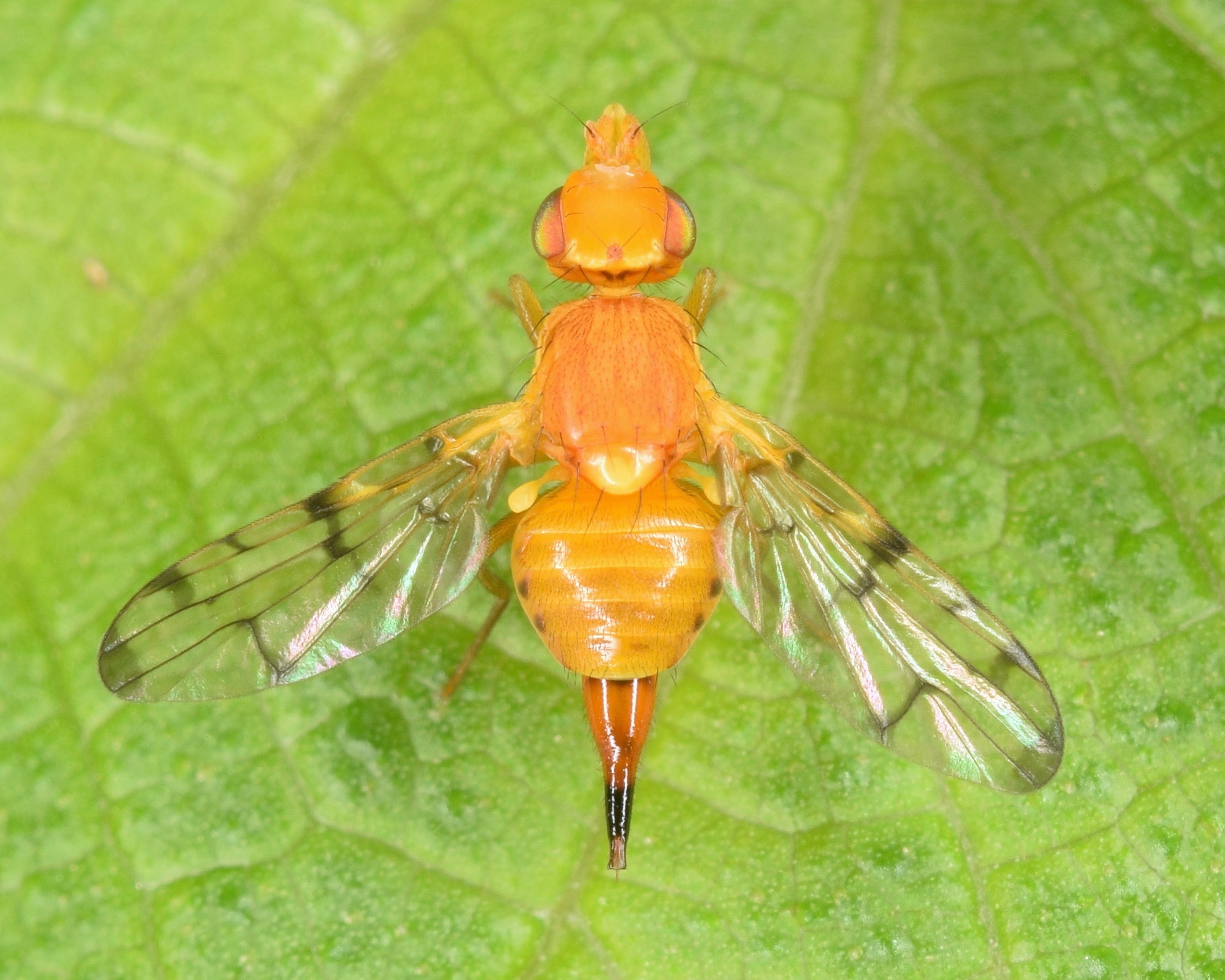
- Rhynencina longirostris

Scientific classification
- Kingdom: Animalia
- Phylum: Arthropoda
- Class: Insecta
- Order: Diptera
- Family: Tephritidae
- Subfamily: Tephritinae
- Tribe: Myopitini
- Genus: Rhynencina
- Species: R. longirostris

Binomial name
- Rhynencina longirostris Johnson, 1922

Synonyms
- Aleomyia alpha Phillips, 1923

= Rhynencina longirostris =

Species of fly

Rhynencina longirostris is a species of fruit fly in the family Tephritidae.

== Distribution ==
United States.
