= Dyseuaresta =

Scientific classification
- Kingdom: Animalia
- Phylum: Arthropoda
- Class: Insecta
- Order: Diptera
- Family: Tephritidae
- Subfamily: Tephritinae
- Tribe: Tephritini
- Genus: Dyseuaresta; Hendel, 1928

Type species
- Euaresta adelphica Hendel, 1914

Genus of flies

Dyseuaresta is a genus of tephritid or fruit flies in the family Tephritidae.

== Species ==
- Dyseuaresta adelphica (Hendel, 1914)
- Dyseuaresta apicalis Hendel, 1928
- Dyseuaresta bilineata (Foote, 1982)
- Dyseuaresta caracasana (Foote, 1980)
- Dyseuaresta fuscoapicalis Hering, 1942
- Dyseuaresta gephyrae (Hendel, 1914)
- Dyseuaresta impluviata (Blanchard, 1854)
- Dyseuaresta mexicana (Wiedemann, 1830)
- Dyseuaresta signifera Hering, 1937
- Dyseuaresta sobrinata (Wulp, 1900)
- Dyseuaresta tenuis (Loew, 1873)
- Dyseuaresta trinotata Bates, 1934
