= U. japonica =

U. japonica may refer to:

- Umbraulva japonica, an alga species in the genus Umbraulva
- Urophora japonica, a fruit fly species

== Synonyms ==
- Uvaria japonica, a synonym for Kadsura japonica, an ornamental plant species

== See also ==
- Japonica (disambiguation)
