= Urophora sinica =

Scientific classification
- Kingdom: Animalia
- Phylum: Arthropoda
- Class: Insecta
- Order: Diptera
- Family: Tephritidae
- Subfamily: Tephritinae
- Tribe: Myopitini
- Genus: Urophora
- Species: U. sinica

Binomial name
- Urophora sinica (Zia, 1938)

Synonyms
- Euribia sinica Zia, 1938

Species of fly

Urophora sinica is a species of tephritid or fruit flies in the genus Urophora belonging to the family Tephritidae.

== Distribution ==
China
