= Urophora longicauda =

Scientific classification
- Kingdom: Animalia
- Phylum: Arthropoda
- Class: Insecta
- Order: Diptera
- Family: Tephritidae
- Subfamily: Tephritinae
- Tribe: Myopitini
- Genus: Urophora
- Species: U. longicauda

Binomial name
- Urophora longicauda (Hendel, 1927)

Synonyms
- Euribia longicauda Hendel, 1927; Urophora melanocera Hering, 1938

Species of fly

Urophora longicauda is a species of tephritid or fruit flies in the genus Urophora of the family Tephritidae.

== Distribution ==
Russia, Armenia, Kazakhstan, Uzbekistan, Kyrgyzstan, Afghanistan
