= Urophora dirlbeki =

Scientific classification
- Kingdom: Animalia
- Phylum: Arthropoda
- Class: Insecta
- Order: Diptera
- Family: Tephritidae
- Subfamily: Tephritinae
- Tribe: Myopitini
- Genus: Urophora
- Species: U. dirlbeki

Binomial name
- Urophora dirlbeki Namin & Nozari, 2015

Species of fly

Urophora dirlbeki is a species of tephritid or fruit flies in the genus Urophora of the family Tephritidae.

== Host Plant ==
Flowerheads of Onopordum acanthium
