= Urophora congrua =

Scientific classification
- Kingdom: Animalia
- Phylum: Arthropoda
- Class: Insecta
- Order: Diptera
- Family: Tephritidae
- Subfamily: Tephritinae
- Tribe: Myopitini
- Genus: Urophora
- Species: U. congrua

Binomial name
- Urophora congrua Loew, 1862

Species of fly

Urophora congrua is a species of tephritid or fruit flies in the genus Urophora of the family Tephritidae.

== Distribution ==
France, South Germany, Austria.
