= Urophora bernhardi =

Scientific classification
- Kingdom: Animalia
- Phylum: Arthropoda
- Class: Insecta
- Order: Diptera
- Family: Tephritidae
- Subfamily: Tephritinae
- Tribe: Myopitini
- Genus: Urophora
- Species: U. bernhardi

Binomial name
- Urophora bernhardi Korneyev & White, 1996

Species of flies

Urophora bernhardi is a species of tephritid or fruit flies in the genus Urophora of the family Tephritidae.

== Distribution ==
Kazakhstan.
