= Goedenia steyskali =

Scientific classification
- Kingdom: Animalia
- Phylum: Arthropoda
- Class: Insecta
- Order: Diptera
- Family: Tephritidae
- Subfamily: Tephritinae
- Tribe: Myopitini
- Genus: Goedenia
- Species: G. steyskali

Binomial name
- Goedenia steyskali Goeden, 2002

Species of fly

Goedenia steyskali is a species of tephritid or fruit flies in the genus Goedenia of the family Tephritidae.

== Distribution ==
California.
