= Urophora terebrans =

Scientific classification
- Kingdom: Animalia
- Phylum: Arthropoda
- Class: Insecta
- Order: Diptera
- Family: Tephritidae
- Subfamily: Tephritinae
- Tribe: Myopitini
- Genus: Urophora
- Species: U. terebrans

Binomial name
- Urophora terebrans (Loew, 1850)

Synonyms
- Trypeta terebrans Loew, 1850; Trypeta eriolepidis Loew, 1856; Trypeta eriolepidis Loew, 1856; Euribia approximata Hering, 1938; Euribia satunini Zaitzev, 1945

Species of fly

Urophora terebrans is a species of tephritid or fruit flies in the genus Urophora of the family Tephritidae.

== Distribution ==
France, Spain, Germany & Poland South to Italy, Turkey & Caucasus.
