= Urophora bakhtiari =

Scientific classification
- Kingdom: Animalia
- Phylum: Arthropoda
- Clade: Pancrustacea
- Class: Insecta
- Order: Diptera
- Family: Tephritidae
- Subfamily: Tephritinae
- Tribe: Myopitini
- Genus: Urophora
- Species: U. bakhtiari

Binomial name
- Urophora bakhtiari Namin & Nozari, 2015

Species of fly

Urophora bakhtiari is a species of tephritid or fruit flies in the genus Urophora of the family Tephritidae. Its host plant is flower heads of Cousinia archibaldii.
