= Urophora kasachstanica =

Scientific classification
- Kingdom: Animalia
- Phylum: Arthropoda
- Class: Insecta
- Order: Diptera
- Family: Tephritidae
- Subfamily: Tephritinae
- Tribe: Myopitini
- Genus: Urophora
- Species: U. kasachstanica

Binomial name
- Urophora kasachstanica (Richter, 1964)

Synonyms
- Euribia kasachstanica Richter, 1964

Species of fly

Urophora kasachstanica is a species of tephritid or fruit flies in the genus Urophora of the family Tephritidae.

== Distribution ==
Ukraine, Kazakhstan, Uzbekistan, Tadzhikistan
