= Dyseuaresta bilineata =

Scientific classification
- Kingdom: Animalia
- Phylum: Arthropoda
- Class: Insecta
- Order: Diptera
- Family: Tephritidae
- Subfamily: Tephritinae
- Tribe: Tephritini
- Genus: Dyseuaresta
- Species: D. bilineata

Binomial name
- Dyseuaresta bilineata (Foote, 1982)

Synonyms
- Trupanea bilineata Foote, 1982

Species of fly

Dyseuaresta bilineata is a species of tephritid or fruit flies in the genus Dyseuaresta of the family Tephritidae.

== Distribution ==
Galapagos Islands.
