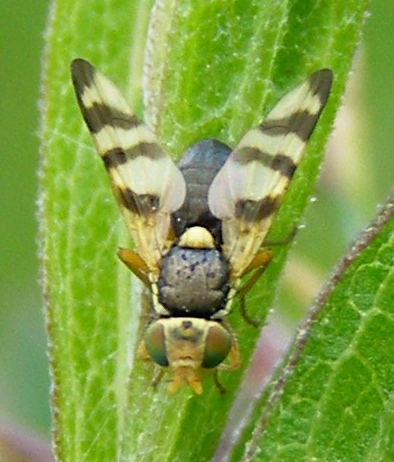
- Urophora jaceana

Scientific classification
- Kingdom: Animalia
- Phylum: Arthropoda
- Class: Insecta
- Order: Diptera
- Family: Tephritidae
- Subfamily: Tephritinae
- Tribe: Myopitini
- Genus: Urophora
- Species: U. jaceana

Binomial name
- Urophora jaceana (Hering, 1935)

Synonyms
- Euribia jaceana Hering, 1935; Euribia conyrac Hering, 1934; Euribia conyzae Hering, 1934

= Urophora jaceana =

Species of fly

Urophora jaceana is a species of tephritid or fruit flies in the genus Urophora of the family Tephritidae. The host plant for the larvae is usually black knapweed (Centaurea nigra) or Centaurea debeauxii.

== Distribution ==
United Kingdom & Finland. South to France, Italy, Romania, Ukraine, east Russia; introduced to east Canada.
