= Urophora syriaca =

Scientific classification
- Kingdom: Animalia
- Phylum: Arthropoda
- Class: Insecta
- Order: Diptera
- Family: Tephritidae
- Subfamily: Tephritinae
- Tribe: Myopitini
- Genus: Urophora
- Species: U. syriaca

Binomial name
- Urophora syriaca (Hendel, 1927)

Synonyms
- Euribia syriaca Hendel, 1927; Euribia erichischmidti Hering, 1953

Species of fly

Urophora syriaca is a species of tephritid or fruit flies in the genus Urophora of the family Tephritidae.

== Distribution ==
Syria, Lebanon, Israel
