= Urophora variabilis =

Scientific classification
- Kingdom: Animalia
- Phylum: Arthropoda
- Class: Insecta
- Order: Diptera
- Family: Tephritidae
- Subfamily: Tephritinae
- Tribe: Myopitini
- Genus: Urophora
- Species: U. variabilis

Binomial name
- Urophora variabilis Loew, 1869

Synonyms
- Euribia kiritshenkoi Zaitzev, 1945

Species of fly

Urophora variabilis is a species of tephritid or fruit flies in the genus Urophora of the family Tephritidae.

== Distribution ==
Moldova, Ukraine, South Russia (Caucasus), Georgia, Turkmenistan.
