= Urophora pontica =

Scientific classification
- Kingdom: Animalia
- Phylum: Arthropoda
- Class: Insecta
- Order: Diptera
- Family: Tephritidae
- Subfamily: Tephritinae
- Tribe: Myopitini
- Genus: Urophora
- Species: U. pontica

Binomial name
- Urophora pontica (Hering, 1937)

Synonyms
- Euribia dzieduszyckii ssp. pontica Hering, 1937

Species of fly

Urophora pontica is a species of tephritid or fruit flies in the genus Urophora of the family Tephritidae.

== Distribution ==
France, Turkey, Russia, Kazakhstan.
