= Urophora egestata =

Scientific classification
- Kingdom: Animalia
- Phylum: Arthropoda
- Class: Insecta
- Order: Diptera
- Family: Tephritidae
- Subfamily: Tephritinae
- Tribe: Myopitini
- Genus: Urophora
- Species: U. egestata

Binomial name
- Urophora egestata (Hering, 1953)

Synonyms
- Euribia egestata Hering, 1953; Urophora ensata Richter, 1975

Species of fly

Urophora egestata is a species of tephritid or fruit flies in the genus Urophora of the family Tephritidae.

== Distribution ==
Russia, Mongolia, China.
