= Urophora agromyzella =

Scientific classification
- Kingdom: Animalia
- Phylum: Arthropoda
- Clade: Pancrustacea
- Class: Insecta
- Order: Diptera
- Family: Tephritidae
- Subfamily: Tephritinae
- Tribe: Myopitini
- Genus: Urophora
- Species: U. agromyzella

Binomial name
- Urophora agromyzella Bezzi, 1924

Synonyms
- Urophora cilipennis Bezzi, 1924

Species of fly

Urophora agromyzella is a species of tephritid or fruit flies in the genus Urophora of the family Tephritidae.

== Distribution ==
Uganda, Malawi, Zimbabwe, South Africa.
