= Dictya expansa =

Scientific classification
- Domain: Eukaryota
- Kingdom: Animalia
- Phylum: Arthropoda
- Class: Insecta
- Order: Diptera
- Family: Sciomyzidae
- Genus: Dictya
- Species: D. expansa

Binomial name
- Dictya expansa Steyskal, 1938

Species of fly

Dictya expansa is a species of marsh fly in the family Sciomyzidae.
