= Urophora xanthippe =

Scientific classification
- Kingdom: Animalia
- Phylum: Arthropoda
- Class: Insecta
- Order: Diptera
- Family: Tephritidae
- Subfamily: Tephritinae
- Tribe: Myopitini
- Genus: Urophora
- Species: U. xanthippe

Binomial name
- Urophora xanthippe (Munro, 1934)

Synonyms
- Euribia xanthippe Munro, 1934; Urophora xantippe Dirlbekova & Dirlbek, 1980

Species of flies

Urophora xanthippe is a species of fruit fly in the family Tephritidae.

== Distribution ==
Ukraine, Kazakhstan, Turkmenistan, Tadzhikistan, Afghanistan
