= Urophora korneyevi =

Scientific classification
- Kingdom: Animalia
- Phylum: Arthropoda
- Class: Insecta
- Order: Diptera
- Family: Tephritidae
- Subfamily: Tephritinae
- Tribe: Myopitini
- Genus: Urophora
- Species: U. korneyevi

Binomial name
- Urophora korneyevi White, 1999

Synonyms
- Urophora arctii Korneyev & White, 1993

Species of fly

Urophora korneyevi is a species of tephritid or fruit flies in the genus Urophora of the family Tephritidae.

== Distribution ==
The species is found in Ukraine.
