= Dyseuaresta gephyrae =

Scientific classification
- Kingdom: Animalia
- Phylum: Arthropoda
- Clade: Pancrustacea
- Class: Insecta
- Order: Diptera
- Family: Tephritidae
- Subfamily: Tephritinae
- Tribe: Tephritini
- Genus: Dyseuaresta
- Species: D. gephyrae

Binomial name
- Dyseuaresta gephyrae (Hendel, 1914)

Synonyms
- Euaresta gephyrae Hendel, 1914; Dyseuaresta gephyriae Foote, 1967

Species of fly

Dyseuaresta gephyrae is a species of tephritid or fruit flies in the genus Dyseuaresta of the family Tephritidae.

== Distribution ==
Dyseuaresta gephyrae is found within Ecuador and Peru.
