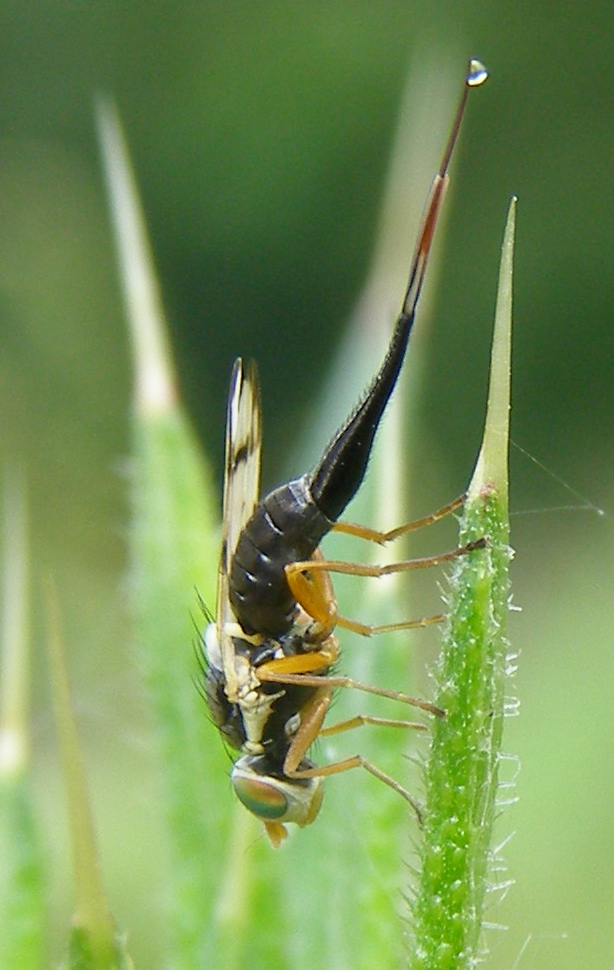
- Female with ovopositor extruded
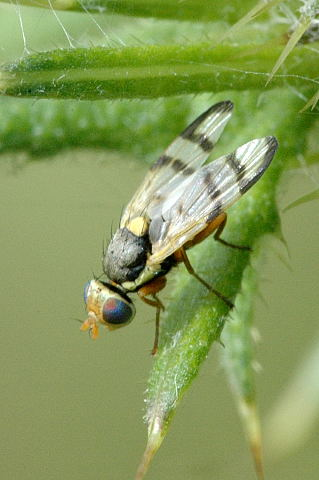
- Male

Scientific classification
- Kingdom: Animalia
- Phylum: Arthropoda
- Class: Insecta
- Order: Diptera
- Family: Tephritidae
- Subfamily: Tephritinae
- Tribe: Myopitini
- Genus: Urophora
- Species: U. stylata

Binomial name
- Urophora stylata (Fabricius, 1775)

Synonyms
- Musca stylata Fabricius, 1775; Trupanea cirsii Schrank, 1803; Trupanea leucacanthi Schrank, 1803; Musca iacobeae Panzer, 1805; Musca jacobeae Panzer, 1805; Urophora stilata Lioy, 1864; Urophora vulcanica Rondani, 1870; Urophora venabulata Rondani, 1870; Euribia leucanthi Hendel, 1927; Euribia pia]] Hering, 1938

= Urophora stylata =

Species of fly

Urophora stylata is a species of tephritid or fruit flies in the genus Urophora of the family Tephritidae. The host plant for the larvae is usually a thistle of genus Cirsium or Carduus.

It has been introduced in North America as a biocontrol of C. vulgare, which has become an invasive species.

== Distribution ==
Throughout Europe East to Japan; introduced to India, Pakistan, Australia, North America.
