= Dyseuaresta tenuis =

Scientific classification
- Kingdom: Animalia
- Phylum: Arthropoda
- Class: Insecta
- Order: Diptera
- Family: Tephritidae
- Subfamily: Tephritinae
- Tribe: Tephritini
- Genus: Dyseuaresta
- Species: D. tenuis

Binomial name
- Dyseuaresta tenuis (Loew, 1873)

Synonyms
- Trypeta tenuis Loew, 1873

Species of fly

Dyseuaresta tenuis is a species of tephritid or fruit flies in the genus Dyseuaresta of the family Tephritidae.

== Distribution ==
Brazil.
