= Xanthaciura unipuncta =

Scientific classification
- Kingdom: Animalia
- Phylum: Arthropoda
- Class: Insecta
- Order: Diptera
- Family: Tephritidae
- Subfamily: Tephritinae
- Tribe: Tephritini
- Genus: Xanthaciura
- Species: X. unipuncta

Binomial name
- Xanthaciura unipuncta Malloch, 1933

Species of fly

Xanthaciura unipuncta is a species of tephritid or fruit flies in the genus Xanthaciura of the family Tephritidae.

== Distribution ==
Guatemala, Colombia, Trinidad, Paraguay, Argentina, Brazil.
