= Urophora aprica =

Scientific classification
- Kingdom: Animalia
- Phylum: Arthropoda
- Class: Insecta
- Order: Diptera
- Family: Tephritidae
- Subfamily: Tephritinae
- Tribe: Myopitini
- Genus: Urophora
- Species: U. aprica

Binomial name
- Urophora aprica (Fallén, 1814)

Synonyms
- Tephritis aprica Fallén, 1814; Tephritis aprica Fallén, 1820; Urophora centaureae var. brunicornis Robineau-Desvoidy, 1830; Urophora scutellata Rondani, 1870

Species of fly

Urophora aprica is a species of tephritid or fruit flies in the genus Urophora of the family Tephritidae.

== Distribution ==
Belgium, Sweden and Finland, south to north Italy, Bulgaria and Caucasus.
