= Dyseuaresta trinotata =

Scientific classification
- Kingdom: Animalia
- Phylum: Arthropoda
- Class: Insecta
- Order: Diptera
- Family: Tephritidae
- Subfamily: Tephritinae
- Tribe: Tephritini
- Genus: Dyseuaresta
- Species: D. trinotata

Binomial name
- Dyseuaresta trinotata Bates, 1934

Species of fly

Dyseuaresta trinotata is a species of tephritid or fruit flies in the genus Dyseuaresta of the family Tephritidae.

== Distribution ==
Puerto Rico, Virgin Island.
