= Tephritomyia grisea =

Scientific classification
- Kingdom: Animalia
- Phylum: Arthropoda
- Class: Insecta
- Order: Diptera
- Family: Tephritidae
- Subfamily: Tephritinae
- Tribe: Tephritini
- Genus: Tephritomyia
- Species: T. grisea

Binomial name
- Tephritomyia grisea (Munro, 1934)

Synonyms
- Acanthiophilus grisea Munro, 1934

Species of fly

Tephritomyia grisea is a species of tephritid or fruit flies in the genus Tephritomyia of the family Tephritidae.

== Distribution ==
Ethiopia, Kenya.
