= Xanthaciura insecta =

Scientific classification
- Kingdom: Animalia
- Phylum: Arthropoda
- Class: Insecta
- Order: Diptera
- Family: Tephritidae
- Subfamily: Tephritinae
- Tribe: Tephritini
- Genus: Xanthaciura
- Species: X. insecta

Binomial name
- Xanthaciura insecta (Loew, 1862)

Synonyms
- Trypeta insecta Loew, 1862

Species of fly

Xanthaciura insecta is a species of tephritid or fruit flies in the genus Xanthaciura of the family Tephritidae.

== Distribution ==
United States, Mexico, South to Venezuela, West Indies.
