= Dyseuaresta sobrinata =

Scientific classification
- Kingdom: Animalia
- Phylum: Arthropoda
- Class: Insecta
- Order: Diptera
- Family: Tephritidae
- Subfamily: Tephritinae
- Tribe: Tephritini
- Genus: Dyseuaresta
- Species: D. sobrinata

Binomial name
- Dyseuaresta sobrinata (Wulp, 1900)

Synonyms
- Euaresta sobrinata Wulp, 1900

Species of fly

Dyseuaresta sobrinata is a species of tephritid or fruit flies in the family Tephritidae.

Dyseuaresta sobrinata measure 3–5 mm (0.12–0.20 in) in length.

== Distribution ==
United States, South to Costa Rica.
