= Xanthaciura phoenicura =

Scientific classification
- Kingdom: Animalia
- Phylum: Arthropoda
- Class: Insecta
- Order: Diptera
- Family: Tephritidae
- Subfamily: Tephritinae
- Tribe: Tephritini
- Genus: Xanthaciura
- Species: X. phoenicura

Binomial name
- Xanthaciura phoenicura (Loew, 1873)

Synonyms
- Trypeta phoenicura Loew, 1873

Species of fly

Xanthaciura phoenicura is a species of tephritid or fruit flies in the genus Xanthaciura of the family Tephritidae.

== Distribution ==
Mexico South to Peru & Brazil.
