= Stamnophora =

Scientific classification
- Kingdom: Animalia
- Phylum: Arthropoda
- Class: Insecta
- Order: Diptera
- Family: Tephritidae
- Subfamily: Tephritinae
- Tribe: Myopitini
- Genus: Stamnophora; Munro, 1955

Type species
- Tephritis vernoniicola Bezzi, 1920

Genus of flies

Stamnophora is a genus of tephritid or fruit flies in the family Tephritidae.
