= Eurasimona =

Scientific classification
- Kingdom: Animalia
- Phylum: Arthropoda
- Class: Insecta
- Order: Diptera
- Family: Tephritidae
- Subfamily: Tephritinae
- Tribe: Myopitini
- Genus: Eurasimona; Korneyev & White, 1991

Type species
- Trypeta stigma Loew, 1840

Species
- Eurasimona fedotovae Korneyev & White, 1991

Genus of flies

Urophora (Eurasimona) is a subgenus, or possibly a genus Eurasimona of the family Tephritidae, better known as fruit flies.
