= Xanthaciura speciosa =

Scientific classification
- Kingdom: Animalia
- Phylum: Arthropoda
- Class: Insecta
- Order: Diptera
- Family: Tephritidae
- Subfamily: Tephritinae
- Tribe: Tephritini
- Genus: Xanthaciura
- Species: X. speciosa

Binomial name
- Xanthaciura speciosa Hendel, 1914

Synonyms
- Xanthaciura specioso Aczél, 1950

Species of fly

Xanthaciura speciosa is a species of tephritid or fruit flies in the genus Xanthaciura of the family Tephritidae.

== Distribution ==
Ecuador, Peru, Argentina.
