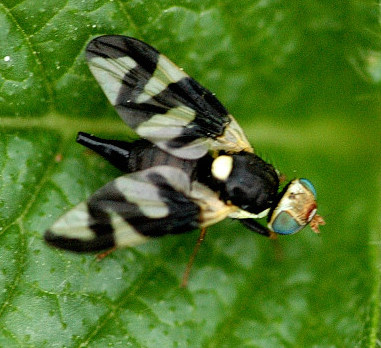
- Urophora cardui

Scientific classification
- Kingdom: Animalia
- Phylum: Arthropoda
- Class: Insecta
- Order: Diptera
- Family: Tephritidae
- Subfamily: Tephritinae
- Tribe: Myopitini
- Genus: Urophora
- Species: U. cardui

Binomial name
- Urophora cardui (Linnaeus, 1758)

Synonyms
- Musca cardui Linnaeus, 1758; Urophora reaumurii Robineau-Desvoidy, 1830; Urophora sonchi Robineau-Desvoidy, 1830; Scatophaga flexuosa Ahrens, 1814

= Urophora cardui =

Species of fly

Urophora cardui or the Canada thistle gall fly is a fruit fly which, contrary to its common name, is indigenous to Central Europe from the United Kingdom east to near the Crimea, and from Sweden south to the Mediterranean.

== Distribution ==
The Canada thistle gall fly has been introduced to North America from Europe to control the population of its host plant, Canada, or creeping thistle, which is an invasive, introduced weed in North America.

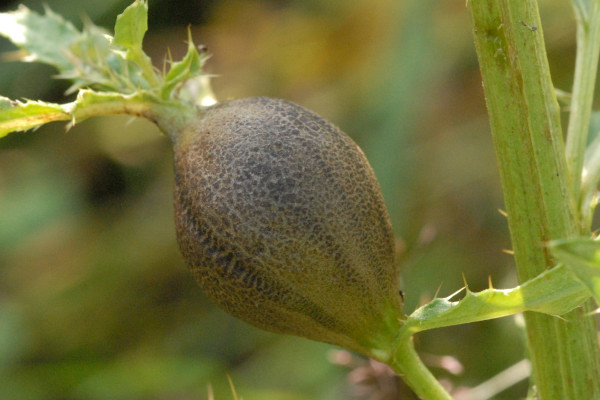
Gall formed by U. cardui on Cirsium arvense

== Life cycle ==
The fly starts life as an egg, one to thirty of which are laid on the stems of its host plant, the Canada or creeping thistle (Cirsium arvense), during the host's growing season. After hatching, the larvae burrow into the stem and form a gall (or swelling). The larvae grow to reach 98% of their full adult body weight, and overwinter in the gall in the third larval stage (instar). They pupate in early spring for 24 to 35 days and appear reddish brown. The adult fly then chews a tunnel and escapes from the gall.
