= Dictya pictipes =

Scientific classification
- Kingdom: Animalia
- Phylum: Arthropoda
- Class: Insecta
- Order: Diptera
- Family: Sciomyzidae
- Genus: Dictya
- Species: D. pictipes

Binomial name
- Dictya pictipes (Loew, 1859)

Synonyms
- Tetanocera pictipes Loew, 1859

Species of fly

Dictya pictipes is a species of marsh fly in the family Sciomyzidae.
