= Urophora cuspidata =

Scientific classification
- Kingdom: Animalia
- Phylum: Arthropoda
- Class: Insecta
- Order: Diptera
- Family: Tephritidae
- Subfamily: Tephritinae
- Tribe: Myopitini
- Genus: Urophora
- Species: U. cuspidata

Binomial name
- Urophora cuspidata (Meigen, 1826)

Synonyms
- Trypeta cuspidata Meigen, 1826

Species of fly

Urophora cuspidata is a species of tephritid or fruit flies in the genus Urophora of the family Tephritidae.

== Distribution ==
North & Central Europe, West Siberia & Caucasus.
