= Tephritomyia caliginosa =

Scientific classification
- Kingdom: Animalia
- Phylum: Arthropoda
- Class: Insecta
- Order: Diptera
- Family: Tephritidae
- Subfamily: Tephritinae
- Tribe: Tephritini
- Genus: Tephritomyia
- Species: T. caliginosa

Binomial name
- Tephritomyia caliginosa (Hering, 1942)

Synonyms
- Acanthiophilus caliginosus Hering, 1942

Species of fly

Tephritomyia caliginosa is a species of tephritid or fruit flies in the genus Tephritomyia of the family Tephritidae.

== Distribution ==
Cameroon.
