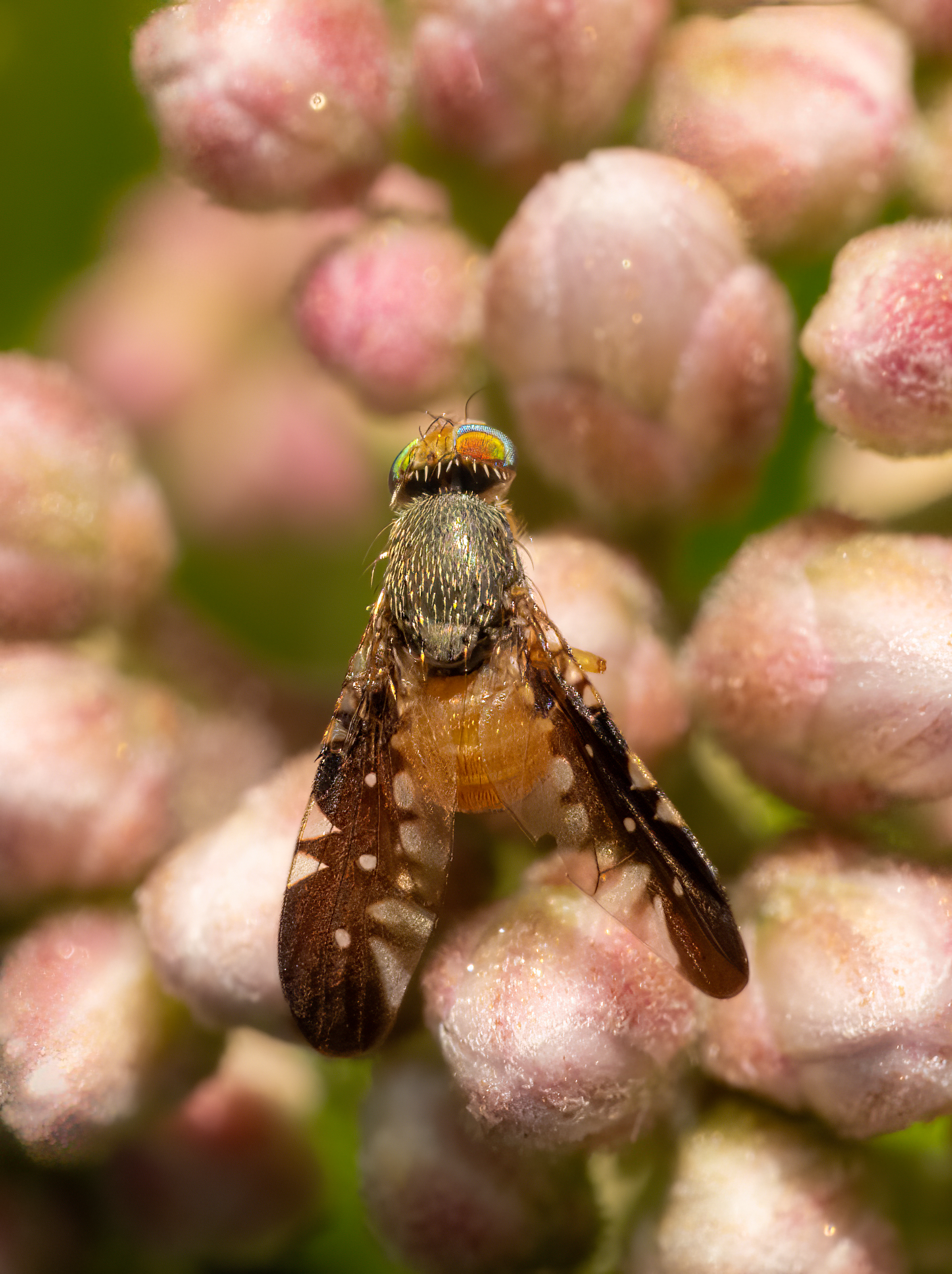

Scientific classification
- Kingdom: Animalia
- Phylum: Arthropoda
- Class: Insecta
- Order: Diptera
- Family: Tephritidae
- Subfamily: Tephritinae
- Tribe: Tephritini
- Genus: Xanthaciura
- Species: X. tetraspina

Binomial name
- Xanthaciura tetraspina (Phillips, 1923)

Synonyms
- Aciura tetraspina Phillips, 1923

= Xanthaciura tetraspina =

Species of fly

Xanthaciura tetraspina is a species of tephritid or fruit flies in the genus Xanthaciura of the family Tephritidae.

== Distribution ==
United States, Mexico, South to Brazil, Bermuda, West Indies.
