= Rhynencina =

Scientific classification
- Kingdom: Animalia
- Phylum: Arthropoda
- Clade: Pancrustacea
- Class: Insecta
- Order: Diptera
- Family: Tephritidae
- Subfamily: Tephritinae
- Tribe: Myopitini
- Genus: Rhynencina; Johnson, 1922

Type species
- Rhynencina longirostris Johnson, 1922

Synonyms
- Aleomyia Phillips, 1923

Genus of flies

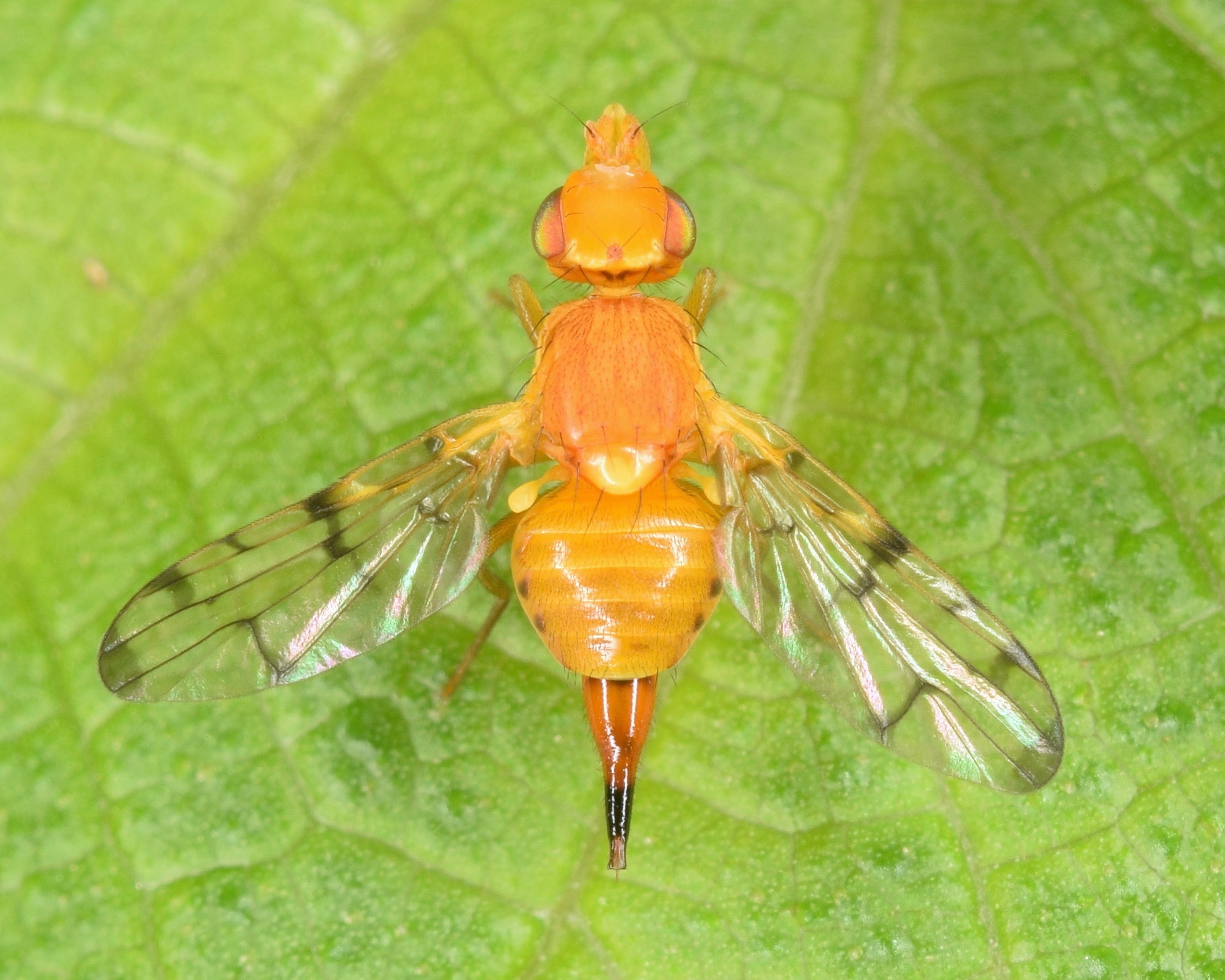
Rhynencina longirostris

Rhynencina is a genus of fruit flies in the family Tephritidae. There are about five described species in Rhynencina.

== Species ==
- Rhynencina dysphanes (Steyskal, 1979)
- Rhynencina emphanes (Steyskal, 1979)
- Rhynencina longirostris Johnson, 1922
- Rhynencina spilogaster (Steyskal, 1979)
- Rhynencina xanthogaster (Steyskal, 1979)
