= Tephritomyia sericea =

Scientific classification
- Kingdom: Animalia
- Phylum: Arthropoda
- Class: Insecta
- Order: Diptera
- Family: Tephritidae
- Subfamily: Tephritinae
- Tribe: Tephritini
- Genus: Tephritomyia
- Species: T. sericea

Binomial name
- Tephritomyia sericea Munro, 1957

Species of fly

Tephritomyia sericea is a species of tephritid or fruit flies in the genus Tephritomyia of the family Tephritidae.

== Distribution ==
Sudan.
