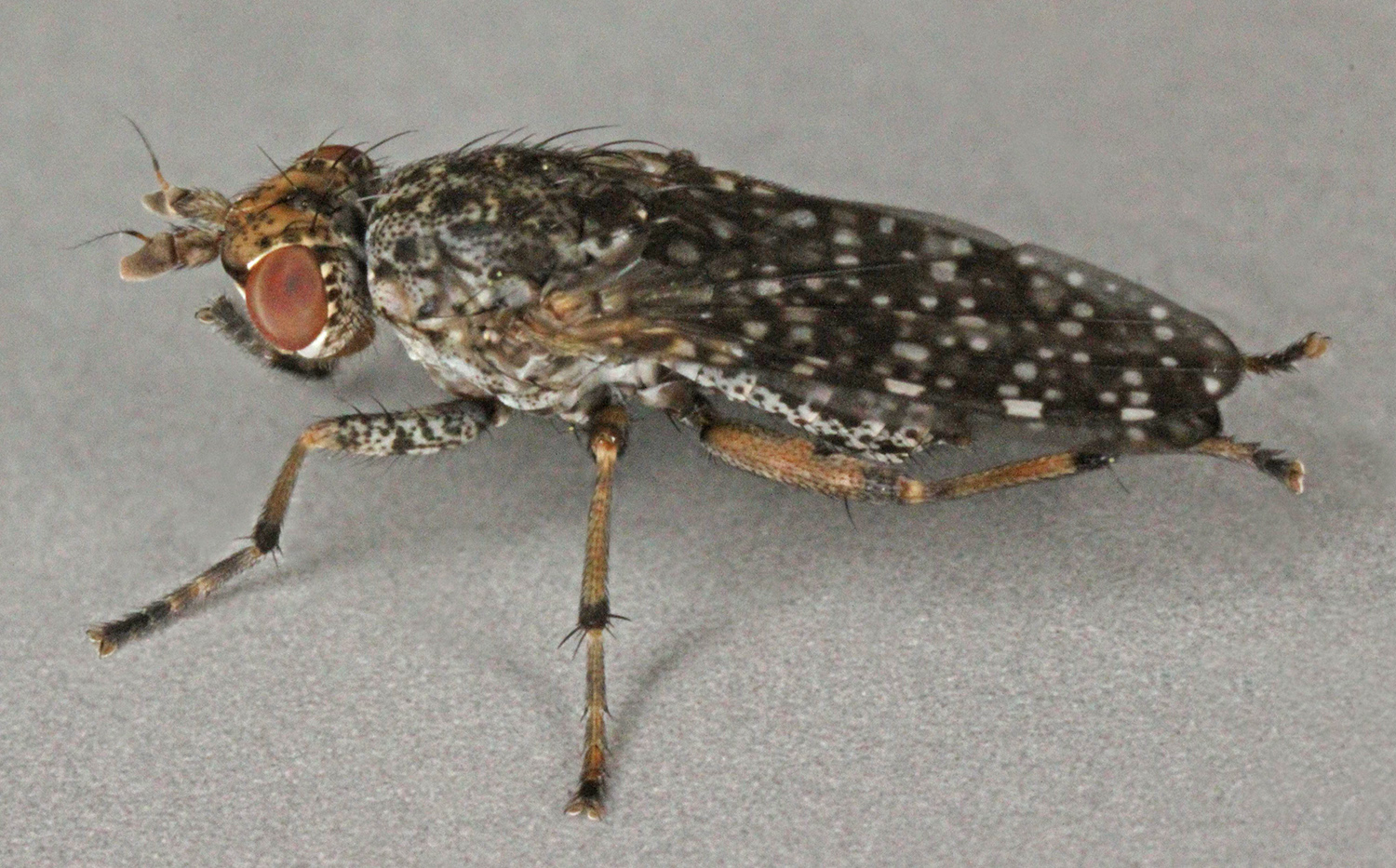
- Dictya umbrarum North Wales

Scientific classification
- Kingdom: Animalia
- Phylum: Arthropoda
- Clade: Pancrustacea
- Class: Insecta
- Order: Diptera
- Family: Sciomyzidae
- Subfamily: Sciomyzinae
- Tribe: Tetanocerini
- Genus: Dictya
- Species: D. umbrarum

Binomial name
- Dictya umbrarum (Linnaeus, 1758)

Synonyms
- Musca umbrarum Linnaeus, 1758; Pherbina paludosa Robineau-Desvoidy, 1830

= Dictya umbrarum =

Species of fly

Dictya umbrarum is a species of fly in the family Sciomyzidae. It is found in the Palearctic and Nearctic. Long. : 4–5 mm. Intensely spotted wings. The interocular space with a black mark at the anterior orbital. The face is white with a black or brown central point. The antennae are reddish, the arista yellow at the base. The body is black (au fond) covered in a grey yellow pruinosity with shifting (changeant) brown spots on the abdomen. The femora are grey with a brown apical band. The tibia are yellow with a brown apical ring (anneau). For terms see Morphology of Diptera. Dictya montana is a predator of aquatic pulmonate snails with no apparent parasitoid tendency.
