= Dyseuaresta adelphica =

Scientific classification
- Kingdom: Animalia
- Phylum: Arthropoda
- Class: Insecta
- Order: Diptera
- Family: Tephritidae
- Subfamily: Tephritinae
- Tribe: Tephritini
- Genus: Dyseuaresta
- Species: D. adelphica

Binomial name
- Dyseuaresta adelphica (Hendel, 1914)

Synonyms
- Euaresta adelphica Hendel, 1914

Species of fly

Dyseuaresta adelphica is a species of tephritid or fruit flies in the genus Dyseuaresta of the family Tephritidae.

== Distribution ==
Paraguay, Brazil.
