= Tephritomyia xiphias =

Scientific classification
- Kingdom: Animalia
- Phylum: Arthropoda
- Class: Insecta
- Order: Diptera
- Family: Tephritidae
- Subfamily: Tephritinae
- Tribe: Tephritini
- Genus: Tephritomyia
- Species: T. xiphias

Binomial name
- Tephritomyia xiphias (Bezzi, 1924)

Synonyms
- Euribia xiphias Bezzi, 1924

Species of fly

Tephritomyia xiphias is a species of tephritid or fruit flies in the genus Tephritomyia of the family Tephritidae.

== Distribution ==
Ethiopia, Cameroon, Uganda, Kenya.
