= Dyseuaresta impluviata =

Scientific classification
- Kingdom: Animalia
- Phylum: Arthropoda
- Class: Insecta
- Order: Diptera
- Family: Tephritidae
- Subfamily: Tephritinae
- Tribe: Tephritini
- Genus: Dyseuaresta
- Species: D. impluviata

Binomial name
- Dyseuaresta impluviata (Blanchard, 1854)

Synonyms
- Acinia impluviata Blanchard, 1854

Species of fly

Dyseuaresta impluviata is a species of tephritid or fruit flies in the genus Dyseuaresta of the family Tephritidae.

== Distribution ==
Chile.
