= Tephritomyia =

Scientific classification
- Kingdom: Animalia
- Phylum: Arthropoda
- Class: Insecta
- Order: Diptera
- Family: Tephritidae
- Subfamily: Tephritinae
- Tribe: Tephritini
- Genus: Tephritomyia; Hendel, 1927

Type species
- Oxyna lauta Loew, 1869

Genus of flies

Tephritomyia is a genus of tephritid or fruit flies in the family Tephritidae.

== Species ==
- Tephritomyia caliginosa (Hering, 1942)
- Tephritomyia despoliata (Hering, 1956)
- Tephritomyia grisea (Munro, 1934)
- Tephritomyia lauta (Loew, 1869)
- Tephritomyia sericea Munro, 1957
- Tephritomyia xiphias (Bezzi, 1924)
