= Dyseuaresta fuscoapicalis =

Scientific classification
- Kingdom: Animalia
- Phylum: Arthropoda
- Class: Insecta
- Order: Diptera
- Family: Tephritidae
- Subfamily: Tephritinae
- Tribe: Tephritini
- Genus: Dyseuaresta
- Species: D. fuscoapicalis

Binomial name
- Dyseuaresta fuscoapicalis Hering, 1942

Species of fly

Dyseuaresta fuscoapicalis is a species of tephritid or fruit flies in the genus Dyseuaresta of the family Tephritidae.

== Distribution ==
Argentina.
