= Xanthaciura connexionis =

Scientific classification
- Kingdom: Animalia
- Phylum: Arthropoda
- Class: Insecta
- Order: Diptera
- Family: Tephritidae
- Subfamily: Tephritinae
- Tribe: Tephritini
- Genus: Xanthaciura
- Species: X. connexionis

Binomial name
- Xanthaciura connexionis Benjamin, 1934

Synonyms
- Xanthaciura brevinervis Malloch, 1933

Species of fly

Xanthaciura connexionis is a species of tephritid or fruit flies in the genus Xanthaciura of the family Tephritidae.

== Distribution ==
United States South to Costa Rica, Venezuela, West Indies, Hawaiian Islands.
