= Goedenia =

Scientific classification
- Kingdom: Animalia
- Phylum: Arthropoda
- Class: Insecta
- Order: Diptera
- Family: Tephritidae
- Subfamily: Tephritinae
- Tribe: Myopitini
- Genus: Goedenia; Freidberg & Norrbom, 1999

Type species
- Aleomyia rufipes Curran, 1932

Genus of flies

Goedenia is a genus of the family Tephritidae, better known as fruit flies.

== Species ==
- G. steyskali Goeden, 2002
