= Tephritomyia despoliata =

Scientific classification
- Kingdom: Animalia
- Phylum: Arthropoda
- Class: Insecta
- Order: Diptera
- Family: Tephritidae
- Subfamily: Tephritinae
- Tribe: Tephritini
- Genus: Tephritomyia
- Species: T. despoliata

Binomial name
- Tephritomyia despoliata (Hering, 1956)

Synonyms
- Acanthiophilus despoliata Hering, 1956

Species of fly

Tephritomyia despoliata is a species of tephritid or fruit flies in the genus Tephritomyia of the family Tephritidae.

== Distribution ==
Iran.
