= Xanthaciura quadrisetosa =

Scientific classification
- Kingdom: Animalia
- Phylum: Arthropoda
- Class: Insecta
- Order: Diptera
- Family: Tephritidae
- Subfamily: Tephritinae
- Tribe: Tephritini
- Genus: Xanthaciura
- Species: X. quadrisetosa

Binomial name
- Xanthaciura quadrisetosa Hendel, 1914

Synonyms
- Tetraciura quadrisetosa Hendel, 1914; Tetraciura quadriseta Hendel, 1914

Species of fly

Xanthaciura quadrisetosa is a species of tephritid or fruit flies in the genus Xanthaciura of the family Tephritidae.

== Distribution ==
Bolivia, Brazil, Argentina.
