= Spinicosta =

Scientific classification
- Kingdom: Animalia
- Phylum: Arthropoda
- Class: Insecta
- Order: Diptera
- Family: Tephritidae
- Subfamily: Tephritinae
- Tribe: Myopitini
- Genus: Spinicosta; Freidberg & Norrbom, 1999

Type species
- Urophora cilipennis Bezzi, 1924

Genus of flies

Spinicosta is a genus of the family Tephritidae, better known as fruit flies.
