= Dyseuaresta mexicana =

Scientific classification
- Kingdom: Animalia
- Phylum: Arthropoda
- Class: Insecta
- Order: Diptera
- Family: Tephritidae
- Subfamily: Tephritinae
- Tribe: Tephritini
- Genus: Dyseuaresta
- Species: D. mexicana

Binomial name
- Dyseuaresta mexicana (Wiedemann, 1830)

Synonyms
- Trypeta mexicana Wiedemann, 1830; Trypeta melanogastra Loew, 1862; Euaresta plesia Curran, 1928

Species of fly

Dyseuaresta mexicana is a species of tephritid or fruit flies in the genus Dyseuaresta of the family Tephritidae.

== Distribution ==
United States South to Colombia & Venezuela, West Indies.
