= Xanthaciura chrysura =

Scientific classification
- Kingdom: Animalia
- Phylum: Arthropoda
- Class: Insecta
- Order: Diptera
- Family: Tephritidae
- Subfamily: Tephritinae
- Tribe: Tephritini
- Genus: Xanthaciura
- Species: X. chrysura

Binomial name
- Xanthaciura chrysura (Thomson, 1869)

Synonyms
- Trypeta chrysura Thomson, 1869; Xanthaciura contracta Hering, 1937; Aciura erosa Enderlein, 1911

Species of fly

Xanthaciura chrysura is a species of tephritid or fruit flies in the genus Xanthaciura of the family Tephritidae.

== Distribution ==
United States, Mexico, South to Argentina, Brazil.
