= Myopitora =

Scientific classification
- Kingdom: Animalia
- Phylum: Arthropoda
- Class: Insecta
- Order: Diptera
- Family: Tephritidae
- Subfamily: Tephritinae
- Tribe: Myopitini
- Genus: Myopitora; Korneyev & White, 1991

Type species
- Myopitora shatalkini Korneyev & White, 1991

Genus of flies

Myopitora is a genus of the family Tephritidae, better known as fruit flies.
