= Xanthaciura flavicauda =

Scientific classification
- Kingdom: Animalia
- Phylum: Arthropoda
- Class: Insecta
- Order: Diptera
- Family: Tephritidae
- Subfamily: Tephritinae
- Tribe: Tephritini
- Genus: Xanthaciura
- Species: X. flavicauda

Binomial name
- Xanthaciura flavicauda Aczél, 1953

Species of fly

Xanthaciura flavicauda is a species of tephritid or fruit flies in the genus Xanthaciura of the family Tephritidae.

== Distribution ==
Nicaragua to Panama, Guyana, Trinidad.
