= Urophora fedotovae =

Scientific classification
- Kingdom: Animalia
- Phylum: Arthropoda
- Class: Insecta
- Order: Diptera
- Family: Tephritidae
- Genus: Urophora
- Species: U. fedotovae

Binomial name
- Urophora fedotovae Korneyev & White, 1991

Species of fly

Urophora fedotovae is a species of tephritid or fruit flies in the genus Eurasimona of the family Tephritidae.
