= Xanthaciura biocellata =

Scientific classification
- Kingdom: Animalia
- Phylum: Arthropoda
- Class: Insecta
- Order: Diptera
- Family: Tephritidae
- Subfamily: Tephritinae
- Tribe: Tephritini
- Genus: Xanthaciura
- Species: X. biocellata

Binomial name
- Xanthaciura biocellata (Thomson, 1869)

Synonyms
- Trypeta biocellata Thomson, 1869

Species of fly

Xanthaciura biocellata is a species of tephritid or fruit flies in the genus Xanthaciura of the family Tephritidae.

== Distribution ==
Peru, Bolivia, Paraguay, Argentina, Brazil, Uruguay.
