= Inuromaesa =

Scientific classification
- Kingdom: Animalia
- Phylum: Arthropoda
- Class: Insecta
- Order: Diptera
- Family: Tephritidae
- Subfamily: Tephritinae
- Tribe: Myopitini
- Genus: Inuromaesa; Korneyev & White, 1991

Type species
- Trypeta maura Frauenfeld, 1857

Genus of flies

Inuromaesa is a genus of the family Tephritidae, better known as fruit flies.
