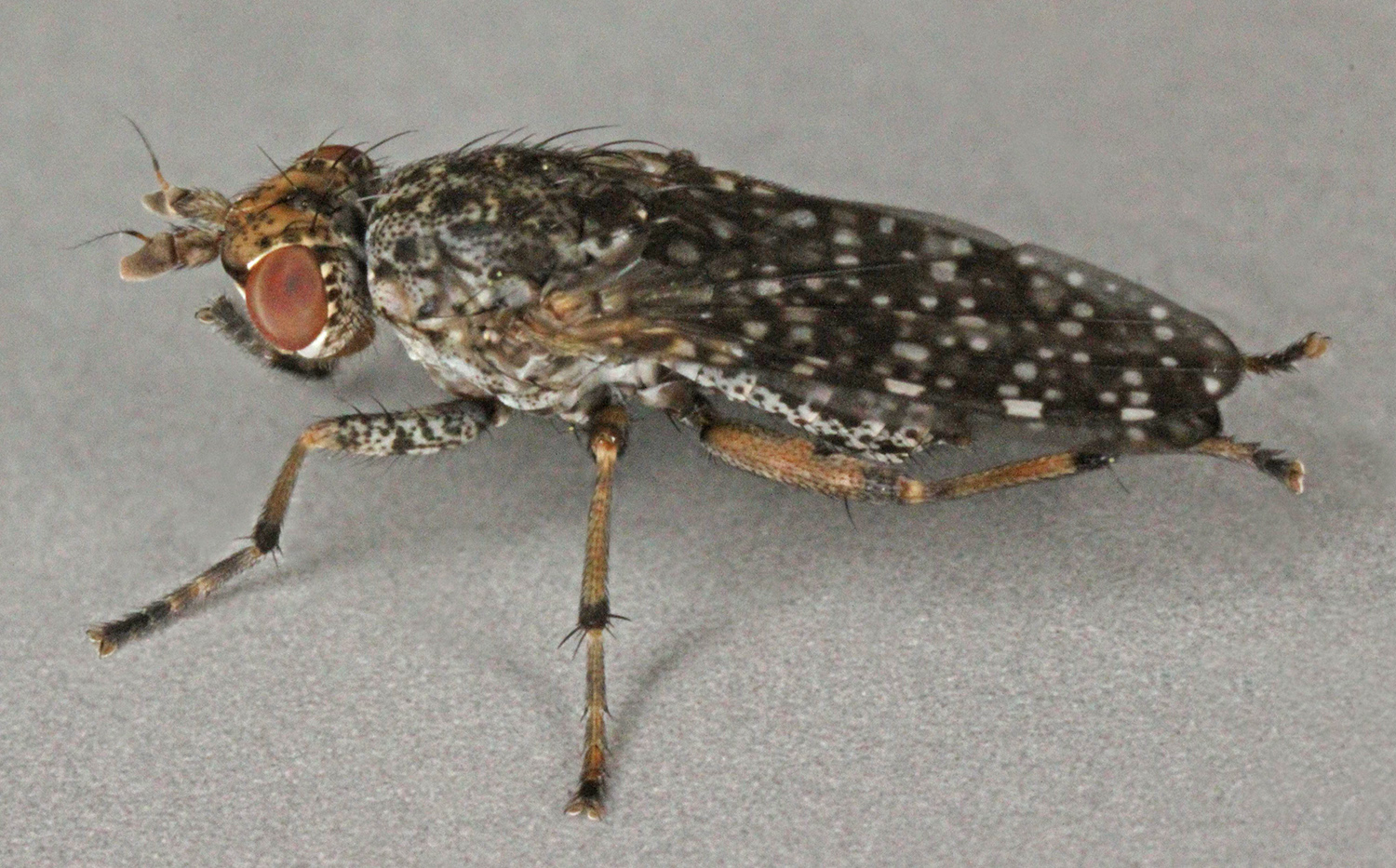
- Dictya umbrarum

Scientific classification
- Domain: Eukaryota
- Kingdom: Animalia
- Phylum: Arthropoda
- Class: Insecta
- Order: Diptera
- Family: Sciomyzidae
- Subfamily: Sciomyzinae
- Tribe: Tetanocerini
- Genus: Dictya; Meigen, 1803

Synonyms
- Monochaetophora Hendel, 1900

= Dictya =

Genus of flies

Dictya is a genus of marsh flies in the family Sciomyzidae. There are at least 20 described species in Dictya.

== Species ==
- D. abnormis Steyskal, 1954
- D. adjuncta Valley, 1977
- D. atlantica Steyskal, 1954
- D. atlantica Murphy, 2014
- D. bergi Valley, 1977
- D. borealis Curran, 1932
- D. brimleyi Steyskal, 1954
- D. caliente Orth, 1991
- D. chihuahua Orth, 1991
- D. disjuncta Orth, 1991
- D. expansa Steyskal, 1938
- D. fisheri Orth, 1991
- D. floridensis Steyskal, 1954
- D. frontinalis Fisher and Orth, 1969
- D. gaigei Steyskal, 1938
- D. guatemalana Steyskal, 1954
- D. hudsonica Steyskal, 1954
- D. incisa Curran, 1932
- D. insularis Steyskal, 1954
- D. jamaica Orth, 1991
- D. knutsomi Orth, 1991
- D. laurentiana Steyskal, 1954
- D. lobifera Curran, 1932
- D. matthewsi Steyskal, 1960
- D. mexicana Steyskal, 1954
- D. montana Steyskal, 1954
- D. neffi Steyskal, 1960
- D. orion Orth, 1991
- D. orthi Mathis, Knutson & Murphy, 2009
- D. oxybeles Steyskal, 1960
- D. pechumani Valley, 1977
- D. pictipes (Loew, 1859)
- D. praecipua Orth, 1991
- D. ptyarion Steyskal, 1954
- D. sabroskyi Steyskal, 1938
- D. sinaloae Orth, 1991
- D. steyskali Valley, 1977
- D. stricta Steyskal, 1938
- D. texensis Curran, 1932
- D. umbrarum (Linnaeus, 1758)
- D. umbroides Curran, 1932
- D. valleyi Orth, 1991
- D. veracruz Orth, 1991
- D. zacki Orth and Fisher, 1983
