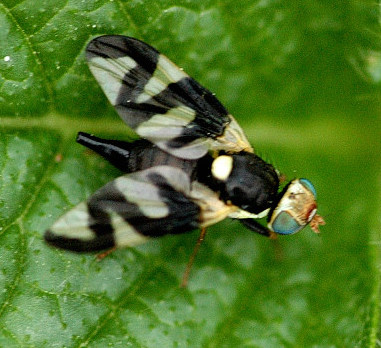
- U. cardui

Scientific classification
- Kingdom: Animalia
- Phylum: Arthropoda
- Class: Insecta
- Order: Diptera
- Family: Tephritidae
- Subfamily: Tephritinae
- Tribe: Myopitini
- Genus: Urophora; Robineau-Desvoidy, 1830

Type species
- Musca cardui Linnaeus, 1758

Synonyms
- Euribia Meigen, 1800

= Urophora =

Genus of flies

Urophora is a genus of tephritid or fruit flies in the family Tephritidae.

== Species ==
- Urophora acompsa (Hendel, 1914)
- Urophora aerea (Hering, 1942)
- Urophora affinis (Frauenfeld, 1857)
- Urophora agnata (Hering, 1942)
- Urophora agromyzella Bezzi, 1924
- Urophora algerica (Hering, 1941)
- Urophora anthropovi Korneyev & White, 1992
- Urophora aprica (Fallén, 1814)
- Urophora bajae Steyskal, 1979
- Urophora bakhtiari Namin & Nozari, 2015
- Urophora bernhardi Korneyev & White, 1996
- Urophora calcitrapae White & Korneyev, 1989
- Urophora campestris Ito, 1983
- Urophora cardui (Linnaeus, 1758)
- Urophora caurina (Doane, 1899)
- Urophora chaetostoma (Hering, 1941)
- Urophora chakassica Shcherbakov, 2001
- Urophora chejudoensis Kwon, 1985
- Urophora chimborazonis Steyskal, 1979
- Urophora christophi Loew, 1869
- Urophora circumflava Korneyev, 1998
- Urophora claripennis Foote, 1987
- Urophora columbiana (Hering, 1942)
- Urophora conferta (Walker, 1853)
- Urophora congrua Loew, 1862
- Urophora cordillerana Steyskal, 1979
- Urophora coronata Basov, 1990
- Urophora cubana Dirlbek & Dirlbeková, 1973
- Urophora cuspidata (Meigen, 1826)
- Urophora cuzconis Steyskal, 1979
- Urophora dirlbeki Namin & Nozari, 2015
- Urophora digna Richter, 1975
- Urophora disjuncta Becker, 1919
- Urophora doganlari Kütük, 2006
- Urophora dzieduszyckii Frauenfeld, 1867
- Urophora egestata (Hering, 1953)
- Urophora euryparia Steyskal, 1979
- Urophora eved Steyskal, 1979
- Urophora fedotovae Korneyev & White, 1991
- Urophora formosa (Coquillett, 1894)
- Urophora formosana (Shiraki, 1933)
- Urophora funebris (Hering, 1941)
- Urophora grindeliae (Coquillett, 1908)
- Urophora hermonis Freidberg, 1974
- Urophora hispanica Strobl, 1905
- Urophora hodgesi Steyskal, 1979
- Urophora hoenei (Hering, 1936)
- Urophora iani Korneyev & Merz, 1998
- Urophora impicta (Hering, 1942)
- Urophora ivannikovi Korneyev & White, 1996
- Urophora jaceana (Hering, 1935)
- Urophora jaculata Rondani, 1870
- Urophora jamaicensis Steyskal, 1979
- Urophora japonica (Shiraki, 1933)
- Urophora kasachstanica (Richter, 1964)
- Urophora korneyevi White, 1999
- Urophora longicauda (Hendel, 1927)
- Urophora lopholomae White & Korneyev, 1989
- Urophora mamarae (Hendel, 1914)
- Urophora mandschurica (Hering, 1940)
- Urophora mauritanica Macquart, 1851
- Urophora melanops Steyskal, 1979
- Urophora mexicana Steyskal, 1979
- Urophora misakiana (Matsumura, 1916)
- Urophora mora (Hering, 1941)
- Urophora neuenschwanderi Freidberg, 1982
- Urophora nigricornis Hendel, 1910
- Urophora paulensis Steyskal, 1979
- Urophora pauperata (Zaitzev, 1945)
- Urophora phalolepidis Merz & White, 1991
- Urophora pontica (Hering, 1937)
- Urophora quadrifasciata (Meigen, 1826)
- Urophora regis Steyskal, 1979
- Urophora repeteki (Munro, 1934)
- Urophora rufipes (Curran, 1932)
- Urophora sachalinensis (Shiraki, 1933)
- Urophora sciadocousiniae Korneyev & White, 1992
- Urophora setosa Foote, 1987
- Urophora simplex Becker, 1919
- Urophora sinica Zia, 1938
- Urophora sirunaseva (Hering, 1938)
- Urophora sjumorum (Rohdendorf, 1937)
- Urophora solaris Korneyev, 1984
- Urophora solstitialis (Linnaeus, 1758)
- Urophora spatiosa (Becker, 1913)
- Urophora spoliata (Haliday, 1838)
- Urophora stalker Korneyev, 1984
- Urophora stenoparia Steyskal, 1979
- Urophora stigma (Loew, 1840)
- Urophora stylata (Fabricius, 1775)
- Urophora syriaca (Hendel, 1927)
- Urophora tengritavica Korneyev & Merz, 1998
- Urophora tenuior Hendel, 1910
- Urophora tenuis Becker, 1908
- Urophora terebrans (Loew, 1850)
- Urophora timberlakei Blanc & Foote, 1961
- Urophora townsendi Bezzi, 1923
- Urophora tresmilia Steyskal, 1979
- Urophora trinervii Korneyev & White, 1996
- Urophora trivirgulata Foote, 1960
- Urophora tsoii Korneyev & White, 1993
- Urophora unica Becker, 1919
- Urophora variabilis Loew, 1869
- Urophora vera Korneyev & White, 1996
- Urophora volkovae Korneyev, 1985
- Urophora xanthippe (Munro, 1934)
