= Neomyopites =

Scientific classification
- Kingdom: Animalia
- Phylum: Arthropoda
- Class: Insecta
- Order: Diptera
- Family: Tephritidae
- Subfamily: Tephritinae
- Tribe: Myopitini
- Genus: Neomyopites; Freidberg & Norrbom, 1999

Type species
- Euribia aerea Hering, 1942

Genus of flies

Neomyopites is a genus within the family Tephritidae, commonly known as fruit flies.
