= Richard H. Foote =

American entomologist (1918–2002)

Richard Herbert Foote (2 May 1918 – 9 February 2002) was an American entomologist who specialized in the taxonomy of fruit flies. The Handbook of the Fruit Flies of America North of Mexico published in 1993 was a major work. He was a promoter of the use of information technology for the cataloguing of insect species.

Foote was born in Bozeman, Montana to Herbert and June. His father was a director of the water and sewage division of the Montana government and had been involved in management of typhoid. Foote graduated from Montana State University in 1941 and served in the US Army in Europe and worked in pest control after the war. He became a curator of medical insects at the CDC collection in Atlanta, Georgia in 1947. He received a ScD from Johns Hopkins University in 1952 with studies on mosquito larvae. He then joined the US Department of Agriculture to catalogue the medically important mosquitoes. In 1954 he shifted to the study of Tephritidae and worked there until his retirement in 1983. He continued to work there and produced the Handbook of the Fruit Flies of America North of Mexico in 1993. He was also an editor of the Journal of Economic Entomology. He was also an early adopter of computers and information technology for the cataloguing of taxonomic information.
