= George C. Steyskal =

American entomologist

George Constance Steyskal (1909 – 1996) was an American entomologist who specialized in the taxonomy of the flies.

Steyskal was born on March 30, 1909, in Detroit, the oldest of seven siblings. He worked in a factory to help the family and graduated from the Henry Ford Trade School, working as a tool-and-die maker and later being a superintendent of a workshop. He took an interest in entomology as an amateur and when the US Department of Agriculture announced a vacancy, he joined as an agricultural research technician at Washington, D.C. His promotions were slowed by his lack of formal academic qualifications. He worked from 1962 until his retirement in 1979 following which he worked at the National Museum of Natural History. After the death of his wife he moved to Florida and worked as a resident research associate at the Florida State Collection of Arthropods.

Steyskal was also interested in botany and was known for his work on the Tephritidae and Agromyzidae where a knowledge of the host plants was particularly useful. He revised the genus Dictya and his publications included 446 papers which described among others 4 new subfamilies, and 24 new genera. He was knowledgeable in Latin, Greek, European languages apart from studying some Arabic and Japanese and contributed numerous translations. His knowledge of Latin and Greek was particularly useful for scientific nomenclature and he was consulted by many entomologists of his time.

Steyskal died on May 20, 1996, in Gainesville, Florida.
