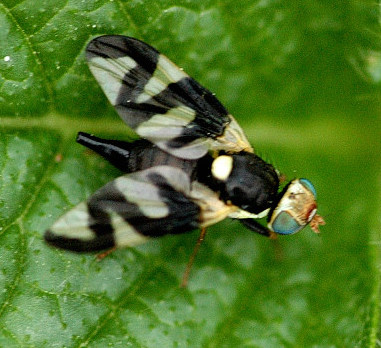
- Urophora cardui

Scientific classification
- Kingdom: Animalia
- Phylum: Arthropoda
- Class: Insecta
- Order: Diptera
- Family: Tephritidae
- Subfamily: Tephritinae
- Tribe: Myopitini

= Myopitini =

Tribe of flies

Myopitini is a tribe of tephritid or fruit flies in the family Tephritidae.

== Genera ==
- Asimoneura Czerny, 1909
- Goedenia Freidberg & Norrbom, 1999
- Inuromaesa Korneyev & White, 1991
- Myopites Blot, 1827
- Myopitora Korneyev & White, 1991
- Neomyopites Korneyev & White, 1991
- Rhynencina Johnson, 1922
- Spinicosta Freidberg & Norrbom, 1999
- Stamnophora Munro, 1955
- Urophora Robineau-Desvoidy, 1830

Also, of unclear status, although originally a subgenus Urophora (Eurasimona):

- Eurasimona Korneyev & White, 1991
