= Zernyi =

Zernyi is a pseudo-Latin word used in some taxonomic names for organisms that often have English names of the form "Zerny's …". Examples include:

- Afraciura zernyi, species of tephritid in the family Tephritidae
- Coleophora zernyi, species of moth of the family Coleophoridae
- Elachista zernyi, species of moth of the family Elachistidae
- Eudalaca zernyi, species of moth of the family Hepialidae
- Hoplojana zernyi, species of moth in the family Eupterotidae
- Megachile zernyi, species of bee in the family Megachilidae
- Metasphenisca zernyi, species of tephritid in the family Tephritidae
- Myopites zernyi, species of tephritid in the family Tephritidae
- Notogomphus zernyi, species of dragonfly in the family Gomphidae
- Oligolimnia zernyi, species of fly in the family Sciomyzidae
- Orophia zernyi, species of moth in the family Depressariidae
- Oxypiloidea zernyi, species of praying mantis in the family Hymenopodidae
- Parastagmatoptera zernyi, species of praying mantis in the family Mantidae
- Pseudocatharylla zernyi, species of moth in the family Crambidae
- Tephritis zernyi, species of tephritid in the family Tephritidae
- Trosia zernyi, species of moth of the family Megalopygidae
- Udea zernyi, species of moth in the family Crambidae
