= Pseudafreutreta biseriata =

Scientific classification
- Kingdom: Animalia
- Phylum: Arthropoda
- Class: Insecta
- Order: Diptera
- Family: Tephritidae
- Subfamily: Tephritinae
- Tribe: Tephrellini
- Genus: Pseudafreutreta
- Species: P. biseriata

Binomial name
- Pseudafreutreta biseriata (Bezzi, 1924)

Synonyms
- Afreutreta biseriata Bezzi, 1924

Species of fly

Pseudafreutreta biseriata is a species of tephritid or fruit flies in the genus Pseudafreutreta of the family Tephritidae.

== Distribution ==
Kenya, Uganda, Zimbabwe, South Africa.
