= Chipingomyia manica =

Scientific classification
- Kingdom: Animalia
- Phylum: Arthropoda
- Class: Insecta
- Order: Diptera
- Family: Tephritidae
- Subfamily: Tephritinae
- Tribe: Tephrellini
- Genus: Chipingomyia
- Species: C. manica

Binomial name
- Chipingomyia manica Hancock, 1986

Species of fly

Chipingomyia manica is a species of tephritid or fruit flies in the genus Chipingomyia of the family Tephritidae.

== Distribution ==
Tanzania, Zimbabwe.
