= Stephanotrypeta nigrofemorata =

Scientific classification
- Kingdom: Animalia
- Phylum: Arthropoda
- Class: Insecta
- Order: Diptera
- Family: Tephritidae
- Subfamily: Tephritinae
- Tribe: Tephrellini
- Genus: Stephanotrypeta
- Species: S. nigrofemorata

Binomial name
- Stephanotrypeta nigrofemorata (Munro, 1929)

Synonyms
- Terellia nigrofemorata Munro, 1929

Species of fly

Stephanotrypeta nigrofemorata is a species of tephritid or fruit flies in the genus Stephanotrypeta of the family Tephritidae.

== Distribution ==
Namibia.
