= Triandomelaena brevicostalis =

Scientific classification
- Kingdom: Animalia
- Phylum: Arthropoda
- Class: Insecta
- Order: Diptera
- Family: Tephritidae
- Subfamily: Tephritinae
- Tribe: Tephrellini
- Genus: Triandomelaena
- Species: T. brevicostalis

Binomial name
- Triandomelaena brevicostalis Hancock, 1986

Species of fly

Triandomelaena brevicostalis is a species of tephritid or fruit fly in the genus Triandomelaena of the family Tephritidae.

== Distribution ==
Zimbabwe.
