= Malaisinia pulcherrima =

Scientific classification
- Kingdom: Animalia
- Phylum: Arthropoda
- Class: Insecta
- Order: Diptera
- Family: Tephritidae
- Subfamily: Tephritinae
- Tribe: Tephrellini
- Genus: Malaisinia
- Species: M. pulcherrima

Binomial name
- Malaisinia pulcherrima Hering, 1938

Species of fly

Malaisinia pulcherrima is a species of tephritid or fruit flies in the genus Malaisinia of the family Tephritidae.

== Distribution ==
Myanmar.
