= Brachyaciura kovacsi =

Scientific classification
- Kingdom: Animalia
- Phylum: Arthropoda
- Class: Insecta
- Order: Diptera
- Family: Tephritidae
- Subfamily: Tephritinae
- Tribe: Tephrellini
- Genus: Brachyaciura
- Species: B. kovacsi

Binomial name
- Brachyaciura kovacsi Bezzi, 1924

Species of fly

Brachyaciura kovacsi is a species of tephritid or fruit flies in the genus Brachyaciura of the family Tephritidae.

== Distribution ==
Ethiopia.
