= Platensina fulvifacies =

Scientific classification
- Kingdom: Animalia
- Phylum: Arthropoda
- Class: Insecta
- Order: Diptera
- Family: Tephritidae
- Subfamily: Tephritinae
- Tribe: Tephrellini
- Genus: Platensina
- Species: P. fulvifacies

Binomial name
- Platensina fulvifacies Hering, 1941

Species of fly

Platensina fulvifacies is a species of tephritid or fruit flies in the genus Platensina of the family Tephritidae.

== Distribution ==
India.
