= Hyaloctoides =

Scientific classification
- Kingdom: Animalia
- Phylum: Arthropoda
- Class: Insecta
- Order: Diptera
- Family: Tephritidae
- Subfamily: Tephritinae
- Tribe: Tephrellini
- Genus: Hyaloctoides; Munro, 1937

Type species
- Trypeta semiatra Loew, 1861

Genus of flies

Elaphromyia is a genus of tephritid or fruit flies in the family Tephritidae.

== Species ==
- Hyaloctoides bioculatus (Bezzi, 1920)
- Hyaloctoides gorgoneus Hering, 1958
- Hyaloctoides semiater (Loew, 1861)
- Hyaloctoides sokotrensis (Hering, 1939)
- Hyaloctoides superhyalinus (Munro, 1929)
