= Metasphenisca nigriseta =

Scientific classification
- Kingdom: Animalia
- Phylum: Arthropoda
- Class: Insecta
- Order: Diptera
- Family: Tephritidae
- Subfamily: Tephritinae
- Tribe: Tephrellini
- Genus: Metasphenisca
- Species: M. nigriseta

Binomial name
- Metasphenisca nigriseta (Bezzi, 1924)

Synonyms
- Aciura nigriseta Bezzi, 1924

Species of fly

Metasphenisca nigriseta is a species of tephritid or fruit flies in the genus Metasphenisca of the family Tephritidae.

== Distribution ==
Ethiopia, Congo, South Africa.
