= Platensina euryptera =

Scientific classification
- Kingdom: Animalia
- Phylum: Arthropoda
- Class: Insecta
- Order: Diptera
- Family: Tephritidae
- Subfamily: Tephritinae
- Tribe: Tephrellini
- Genus: Platensina
- Species: P. euryptera

Binomial name
- Platensina euryptera Bezzi, 1913

Synonyms
- Tephritis euryptera Bezzi, 1913; Platensina extincta Hering, 1952

Species of fly

Platensina euryptera is a species of tephritid or fruit flies in the genus Platensina of the family Tephritidae.

== Distribution ==
Myanmar, Thailand, Indonesia.
