= Ocnerioxyna gracilis =

Scientific classification
- Kingdom: Animalia
- Phylum: Arthropoda
- Class: Insecta
- Order: Diptera
- Family: Tephritidae
- Subfamily: Tephritinae
- Tribe: Tephrellini
- Genus: Ocnerioxyna
- Species: O. gracilis

Binomial name
- Ocnerioxyna gracilis Loew, 1861

Synonyms
- Ocnerioxyna gracilis Loew, 1862; Allotrypes brevicornis Bezzi, 1920

Species of fly

Ocnerioxyna gracilis is a species of tephritid or fruit flies in the genus Ocnerioxyna of the family Tephritidae.

== Distribution ==
Malawi, South Africa.
