= Hyaloctoides sokotrensis =

Scientific classification
- Kingdom: Animalia
- Phylum: Arthropoda
- Class: Insecta
- Order: Diptera
- Family: Tephritidae
- Subfamily: Tephritinae
- Tribe: Tephrellini
- Genus: Hyaloctoides
- Species: H. sokotrensis

Binomial name
- Hyaloctoides sokotrensis (Hering, 1939)

Synonyms
- Pliomelaena sokotrensis Hering, 1939

Species of fly

Hyaloctoides sokotrensis is a species of tephritid or fruit flies in the genus Hyaloctoides of the family Tephritidae.

== Distribution ==
Yemen.
