= Platensina ampla =

Scientific classification
- Kingdom: Animalia
- Phylum: Arthropoda
- Class: Insecta
- Order: Diptera
- Family: Tephritidae
- Subfamily: Tephritinae
- Tribe: Tephrellini
- Genus: Platensina
- Species: P. ampla

Binomial name
- Platensina ampla Hardy, 1974

Species of fly

Platensina ampla is a species of tephritid or fruit flies in the genus Platensina of the family Tephritidae.

== Distribution ==
Indonesia, Papua New Guinea.
