= Munroella myiopitina =

Scientific classification
- Kingdom: Animalia
- Phylum: Arthropoda
- Class: Insecta
- Order: Diptera
- Family: Tephritidae
- Subfamily: Tephritinae
- Tribe: Tephrellini
- Genus: Munroella
- Species: M. myiopitina

Binomial name
- Munroella myiopitina (Bezzi, 1924)

Species of fly

Munroella myiopitina is a species of tephritid or fruit flies in the genus Munroella of the family Tephritidae.

== Distribution ==
Kenya, Malawi, Zimbabwe, South Africa.
