= Sphaeniscus binoculatus =

Scientific classification
- Kingdom: Animalia
- Phylum: Arthropoda
- Class: Insecta
- Order: Diptera
- Family: Tephritidae
- Subfamily: Tephritinae
- Tribe: Tephrellini
- Genus: Sphaeniscus
- Species: S. binoculatus

Binomial name
- Sphaeniscus binoculatus (Bezzi, 1928)

Synonyms
- Spheniscomyia binoculata Bezzi, 1928

Species of fly

Sphaeniscus binoculatus is a species of tephritid or fruit flies in the genus Sphaeniscus of the family Tephritidae.

== Distribution ==
It is found in Fiji.
