= Metasphenisca bezziana =

Scientific classification
- Kingdom: Animalia
- Phylum: Arthropoda
- Clade: Pancrustacea
- Class: Insecta
- Order: Diptera
- Family: Tephritidae
- Subfamily: Tephritinae
- Tribe: Tephrellini
- Genus: Metasphenisca
- Species: M. bezziana

Binomial name
- Metasphenisca bezziana (Enderlein, 1911)

Synonyms
- Trypeta bezziana Enderlein, 1911; Aciura latincisa Bezzi, 1924

Species of fly

Metasphenisca bezziana is a species of tephritid or fruit flies in the genus Metasphenisca of the family Tephritidae.

== Distribution ==
Canary Islands, Eritrea, Kenya, Tanzania.
