= Curticella approximans =

Scientific classification
- Kingdom: Animalia
- Phylum: Arthropoda
- Class: Insecta
- Order: Diptera
- Family: Tephritidae
- Subfamily: Tephritinae
- Tribe: Tephrellini
- Genus: Curticella
- Species: C. approximans

Binomial name
- Curticella approximans (Walker, 1860)

Synonyms
- Trypeta approximans Walker, 1860

Species of fly

Curticella approximans is a species of tephritid or fruit flies in the genus Curticella of the family Tephritidae.

== Distribution ==
Indonesia, Papua New Guinea, Bismarck Archipelago.
