= Platensina woodi =

Scientific classification
- Kingdom: Animalia
- Phylum: Arthropoda
- Class: Insecta
- Order: Diptera
- Family: Tephritidae
- Subfamily: Tephritinae
- Tribe: Tephrellini
- Genus: Platensina
- Species: P. woodi

Binomial name
- Platensina woodi (Bezzi, 1924)

Synonyms
- Tripanea woodi Bezzi, 1924

Species of fly

Platensina woodi is a species of tephritid or fruit flies in the genus Platensina of the family Tephritidae.

== Distribution ==
Ethiopia, Tanzania, Malawi, Mozambique, Zimbabwe.
