= Pliomelaena brevifrons =

Scientific classification
- Kingdom: Animalia
- Phylum: Arthropoda
- Class: Insecta
- Order: Diptera
- Family: Tephritidae
- Subfamily: Tephritinae
- Tribe: Tephrellini
- Genus: Pliomelaena
- Species: P. brevifrons

Binomial name
- Pliomelaena brevifrons Bezzi, 1918

Synonyms
- Euaresta brevifrons Bezzi, 1918; Pliomelaena brevifrons ssp. perspicua Munro, 1947; Pliomelaena brevifrons ssp. regressa Munro, 1947; Pliomelaena brevifrons var. aspila Bezzi, 1924; Pliomelaena brevifrons var. rufiventris Bezzi, 1924; Pliomelaena xyphosiina Bezzi, 1924

Species of fly

Pliomelaena brevifrons is a species of tephritid or fruit flies in the genus Pliomelaena of the family Tephritidae.

== Distribution ==
Cameroon & Ethiopia to South Africa.
