= Platensina guttatolimbata =

Scientific classification
- Kingdom: Animalia
- Phylum: Arthropoda
- Clade: Pancrustacea
- Class: Insecta
- Order: Diptera
- Family: Tephritidae
- Subfamily: Tephritinae
- Tribe: Tephrellini
- Genus: Platensina
- Species: P. guttatolimbata

Binomial name
- Platensina guttatolimbata (Enderlein, 1911)

Synonyms
- Trypeta guttatolimbata Enderlein, 1911

Species of fly

Platensina guttatolimbata is a species of tephritid or fruit flies in the genus Platensina of the family Tephritidae.

== Distribution ==
Madagascar.
