= Platensina zodiacalis =

Scientific classification
- Kingdom: Animalia
- Phylum: Arthropoda
- Class: Insecta
- Order: Diptera
- Family: Tephritidae
- Subfamily: Tephritinae
- Tribe: Tephrellini
- Genus: Platensina
- Species: P. zodiacalis

Binomial name
- Platensina zodiacalis Bezzi, 1913

Synonyms
- Tephritis zodiacalis Bezzi, 1913; Platensina zodiakalis Hering, 1952

Species of fly

Platensina zodiacalis is a species of tephritid or fruit flies in the genus Platensina of the family Tephritidae.

The taxon's scientific description was first published in 1913 by Mario Bezzi.

== Distribution ==
Sri Lanka, Nepal to Laos, Malaysia, Philippines, Indonesia, North Australia.
