= Platensina quadrula =

Scientific classification
- Kingdom: Animalia
- Phylum: Arthropoda
- Class: Insecta
- Order: Diptera
- Family: Tephritidae
- Subfamily: Tephritinae
- Tribe: Tephrellini
- Genus: Platensina
- Species: P. quadrula

Binomial name
- Platensina quadrula Hardy, 1973

Species of fly

Platensina quadrula is a species of fruit fly in the family Tephritidae. It measures 4.5–4.7 mm (0.18–0.19 in) in body length.

== Distribution ==
The species is known from Thailand, Cambodia, and Vietnam.
