= Afraciura quaternaria =

Scientific classification
- Kingdom: Animalia
- Phylum: Arthropoda
- Class: Insecta
- Order: Diptera
- Family: Tephritidae
- Subfamily: Tephritinae
- Tribe: Tephrellini
- Genus: Afraciura
- Species: A. quaternaria

Binomial name
- Afraciura quaternaria (Bezzi, 1924)

Synonyms
- Spheniscomyia quaternaria Bezzi, 1924

Species of fly

Afraciura quaternaria is a species of tephritid or fruit flies in the genus Afraciura of the family Tephritidae.

== Distribution ==
Tanzania, Kenya, Malawi, Zimbabwe, Lesotho, South Africa.
