= Metasphenisca spathuliniforma =

Scientific classification
- Kingdom: Animalia
- Phylum: Arthropoda
- Class: Insecta
- Order: Diptera
- Family: Tephritidae
- Subfamily: Tephritinae
- Tribe: Tephrellini
- Genus: Metasphenisca
- Species: M. spathuliniforma

Binomial name
- Metasphenisca spathuliniforma Dirlbek & Dirlbek, 1968

Species of fly

Metasphenisca spathuliniforma is a species of tephritid or fruit flies in the genus Metasphenisca of the family Tephritidae.

== Distribution ==
Afghanistan.
