= Dorycricus ruater =

Scientific classification
- Kingdom: Animalia
- Phylum: Arthropoda
- Class: Insecta
- Order: Diptera
- Family: Tephritidae
- Subfamily: Tephritinae
- Tribe: Tephrellini
- Genus: Dorycricus
- Species: D. ruater

Binomial name
- Dorycricus ruater Munro, 1947

Species of fly

Dorycricus ruater is a species of tephritid or fruit flies in the genus Dorycricus of the family Tephritidae.

== Distribution ==
Kenya.
