= Tephraciura sphenoptera =

Scientific classification
- Kingdom: Animalia
- Phylum: Arthropoda
- Class: Insecta
- Order: Diptera
- Family: Tephritidae
- Subfamily: Tephritinae
- Tribe: Tephrellini
- Genus: Tephraciura
- Species: T. sphenoptera

Binomial name
- Tephraciura sphenoptera (Bezzi, 1924)

Synonyms
- Aciura sphenoptera Bezzi, 1924

Species of fly

Tephraciura sphenoptera is a species of tephritid or fruit flies in the genus Tephraciura of the family Tephritidae.

== Distribution ==
Ethiopia, Rwanda, Tanzania.
