= Stephanotrypeta vittata =

Scientific classification
- Kingdom: Animalia
- Phylum: Arthropoda
- Class: Insecta
- Order: Diptera
- Family: Tephritidae
- Subfamily: Tephritinae
- Tribe: Tephrellini
- Genus: Stephanotrypeta
- Species: S. vittata

Binomial name
- Stephanotrypeta vittata Freidberg, 1979

Species of fly

Stephanotrypeta vittata is a species of tephritid or fruit flies in the genus Stephanotrypeta of the family Tephritidae.

== Distribution ==
Saudi Arabia, Yemen, Kenya, Tanzania, Madagascar.
