= Paraciura perpicillaris =

Scientific classification
- Kingdom: Animalia
- Phylum: Arthropoda
- Class: Insecta
- Order: Diptera
- Family: Tephritidae
- Subfamily: Tephritinae
- Tribe: Tephrellini
- Genus: Paraciura
- Species: P. perpicillaris

Binomial name
- Paraciura perpicillaris Bezzi, 1920

Synonyms
- Aciura perpicillaris Bezzi, 1920

Species of fly

Paraciura perpicillaris is a species of tephritid or fruit flies in the genus Paraciura of the family Tephritidae.

== Distribution ==
Ghana, Ethiopia, Congo, Uganda, Kenya, Madagascar.
