= Afraciura quinaria =

Scientific classification
- Kingdom: Animalia
- Phylum: Arthropoda
- Class: Insecta
- Order: Diptera
- Family: Tephritidae
- Subfamily: Tephritinae
- Tribe: Tephrellini
- Genus: Afraciura
- Species: A. quinaria

Binomial name
- Afraciura quinaria (Bezzi, 1924)

Synonyms
- Spheniscomyia quinaria Bezzi, 1924

Species of fly

Afraciura quinaria is a species of tephritid or fruit flies in the genus Afraciura of the family Tephritidae.

== Distribution ==
Kenya, Zimbabwe, South Africa.
