= Malagaciura stuckenbergi =

Scientific classification
- Kingdom: Animalia
- Phylum: Arthropoda
- Class: Insecta
- Order: Diptera
- Family: Tephritidae
- Subfamily: Tephritinae
- Tribe: Tephrellini
- Genus: Malagaciura
- Species: M. stuckenbergi

Binomial name
- Malagaciura stuckenbergi Hancock, 1991

Species of fly

Malagaciura stuckenbergi is a species of tephritid or fruit flies in the genus Malagaciura of the family Tephritidae.

== Distribution ==
Madagascar.
