= Triandomelaena albinus =

Scientific classification
- Kingdom: Animalia
- Phylum: Arthropoda
- Class: Insecta
- Order: Diptera
- Family: Tephritidae
- Subfamily: Tephritinae
- Tribe: Tephrellini
- Genus: Triandomelaena
- Species: T. albinus

Binomial name
- Triandomelaena albinus (Bezzi, 1924)

Synonyms
- Euribia albina Bezzi, 1924

Species of fly

Triandomelaena albinus is a species of tephritid or fruit flies in the genus Triandomelaena of the family Tephritidae.

== Distribution ==
East Africa.
