= Metasphenisca grandidieri =

Scientific classification
- Kingdom: Animalia
- Phylum: Arthropoda
- Class: Insecta
- Order: Diptera
- Family: Tephritidae
- Subfamily: Tephritinae
- Tribe: Tephrellini
- Genus: Metasphenisca
- Species: M. grandidieri

Binomial name
- Metasphenisca grandidieri (Bezzi, 1924)

Synonyms
- Aciura grandidieri Bezzi, 1924

Species of fly

Metasphenisca grandidieri is a species of tephritid or fruit flies in the genus Metasphenisca of the family Tephritidae.
