= Tephraciura semiangusta =

Scientific classification
- Kingdom: Animalia
- Phylum: Arthropoda
- Class: Insecta
- Order: Diptera
- Family: Tephritidae
- Subfamily: Tephritinae
- Tribe: Tephrellini
- Genus: Tephraciura
- Species: T. semiangusta

Binomial name
- Tephraciura semiangusta (Bezzi, 1918)

Synonyms
- Aciura semiangusta Bezzi, 1918

Species of fly

Tephraciura semiangusta is a species of tephritid or fruit flies in the genus Tephraciura of the family Tephritidae.

== Distribution ==
Ethiopia, Congo, Zambia, Zimbabwe.
