= Perirhithrum marshalli =

Scientific classification
- Kingdom: Animalia
- Phylum: Arthropoda
- Class: Insecta
- Order: Diptera
- Family: Tephritidae
- Subfamily: Tephritinae
- Tribe: Tephrellini
- Genus: Perirhithrum
- Species: P. marshalli

Binomial name
- Perirhithrum marshalli

Species of fly

Perirhithrum marshalli is a species of tephritid or fruit flies in the genus Perirhithrum of the family Tephritidae.

== Distribution ==
Zimbabwe, South Africa.
