= Stephanotrypeta brevicosta =

Scientific classification
- Kingdom: Animalia
- Phylum: Arthropoda
- Class: Insecta
- Order: Diptera
- Family: Tephritidae
- Subfamily: Tephritinae
- Tribe: Tephrellini
- Genus: Stephanotrypeta
- Species: S. brevicosta

Binomial name
- Stephanotrypeta brevicosta Hendel, 1931

Species of fly

Stephanotrypeta brevicosta is a species of tephritid or fruit flies in the genus Stephanotrypeta of the family Tephritidae.

== Distribution ==
Sudan, Kenya.
