= Pliomelaena joanetta =

Scientific classification
- Kingdom: Animalia
- Phylum: Arthropoda
- Clade: Pancrustacea
- Class: Insecta
- Order: Diptera
- Family: Tephritidae
- Subfamily: Tephritinae
- Tribe: Tephrellini
- Genus: Pliomelaena
- Species: P. joanetta

Binomial name
- Pliomelaena joanetta Munro, 1947

Species of fly

Pliomelaena joanetta is a species of tephritid or fruit flies in the genus Pliomelaena of the family Tephritidae. Its distribution is primarily in Ethiopia and South Africa.
