= Tephraciura latecuneata =

Scientific classification
- Kingdom: Animalia
- Phylum: Arthropoda
- Class: Insecta
- Order: Diptera
- Family: Tephritidae
- Subfamily: Tephritinae
- Tribe: Tephrellini
- Genus: Tephraciura
- Species: T. latecuneata

Binomial name
- Tephraciura latecuneata (Munro, 1947)

Synonyms
- Jacotella latecuneata Munro, 1947

Species of fly

Tephraciura latecuneata is a species of tephritid or fruit flies in the genus Tephraciura of the family Tephritidae.

== Distribution ==
Congo, Namibia, Zimbabwe, South Africa.
