= Metasphenisca marmorea =

Scientific classification
- Kingdom: Animalia
- Phylum: Arthropoda
- Class: Insecta
- Order: Diptera
- Family: Tephritidae
- Subfamily: Tephritinae
- Tribe: Tephrellini
- Genus: Metasphenisca
- Species: M. marmorea

Binomial name
- Metasphenisca marmorea Munro, 1947

Species of fly

Metasphenisca marmorea is a species of tephritid or fruit flies in the genus Metasphenisca of the family Tephritidae.

== Distribution ==
South Africa.
