= Afraciura reculta =

Scientific classification
- Kingdom: Animalia
- Phylum: Arthropoda
- Class: Insecta
- Order: Diptera
- Family: Tephritidae
- Subfamily: Tephritinae
- Tribe: Tephrellini
- Genus: Afraciura
- Species: A. reculta

Binomial name
- Afraciura reculta (Munro, 1947)

Synonyms
- Conionota reculta Munro, 1947

Species of fly

Afraciura reculta is a species of tephritid or fruit flies in the genus Afraciura of the family Tephritidae.

== Distribution ==
Tanzania, Kenya.
