= Pliomelaena stevensoni =

Scientific classification
- Kingdom: Animalia
- Phylum: Arthropoda
- Class: Insecta
- Order: Diptera
- Family: Tephritidae
- Subfamily: Tephritinae
- Tribe: Tephrellini
- Genus: Pliomelaena
- Species: P. stevensoni

Binomial name
- Pliomelaena stevensoni Munro, 1937

Species of fly

Pliomelaena stevensoni is a species of tephritid or fruit flies in the genus Pliomelaena of the family Tephritidae.

== Distribution ==
Kenya, Zimbabwe, South Africa.
