= Namibiocesa oryx =

Scientific classification
- Kingdom: Animalia
- Phylum: Arthropoda
- Class: Insecta
- Order: Diptera
- Family: Tephritidae
- Subfamily: Tephritinae
- Tribe: Tephrellini
- Genus: Namibiocesa
- Species: N. oryx

Binomial name
- Namibiocesa oryx (Munro, 1956)

Synonyms
- Leucothrix oryx Munro, 1956

Species of fly

Namibiocesa oryx is a species of tephritid or fruit flies in the genus Namibiocesa of the family Tephritidae.

It is found in Namibia and South Africa.
