= Metasphenisca negeviana =

Scientific classification
- Kingdom: Animalia
- Phylum: Arthropoda
- Class: Insecta
- Order: Diptera
- Family: Tephritidae
- Subfamily: Tephritinae
- Tribe: Tephrellini
- Genus: Metasphenisca
- Species: M. negeviana

Binomial name
- Metasphenisca negeviana (Freidberg, 1974)

Synonyms
- Isoconia negeviana Freidberg, 1974

Species of fly

Metasphenisca negeviana is a species of tephritid or fruit flies in the genus Metasphenisca of the family Tephritidae.

== Distribution ==
Israel, Egypt, Saudi Arabia.
