= Elaphromyia pterocallaeformis =

Scientific classification
- Kingdom: Animalia
- Phylum: Arthropoda
- Class: Insecta
- Order: Diptera
- Family: Tephritidae
- Subfamily: Tephritinae
- Tribe: Tephrellini
- Genus: Elaphromyia
- Species: E. pterocallaeformis

Binomial name
- Elaphromyia pterocallaeformis (Bezzi, 1913)

Synonyms
- Paralleloptera pterocallaeformis Bezzi, 1913

Species of fly

Elaphromyia pterocallaeformis is a species of tephritid or fruit flies in the genus Elaphromyia of the family Tephritidae.

== Distribution ==
Yemen, India, Philippines.
