= Metasphenisca nigricans =

Scientific classification
- Kingdom: Animalia
- Phylum: Arthropoda
- Class: Insecta
- Order: Diptera
- Family: Tephritidae
- Subfamily: Tephritinae
- Tribe: Tephrellini
- Genus: Metasphenisca
- Species: M. nigricans

Binomial name
- Metasphenisca nigricans (Wiedemann, 1830)

Synonyms
- Trypeta nigricans Wiedemann, 1830

Species of fly

Metasphenisca nigricans is a species of tephritid or fruit flies in the genus Metasphenisca of the family Tephritidae.

== Distribution ==
Afrotropical Region.
