= Tephraciura oborinia =

Scientific classification
- Kingdom: Animalia
- Phylum: Arthropoda
- Class: Insecta
- Order: Diptera
- Family: Tephritidae
- Subfamily: Tephritinae
- Tribe: Tephrellini
- Genus: Tephraciura
- Species: T. oborinia

Binomial name
- Tephraciura oborinia (Walker, 1849)

Synonyms
- Trypeta oborinia Walker, 1849

Species of fly

Tephraciura oborinia is a species of tephritid or fruit flies in the genus Tephraciura of the family Tephritidae.

== Distribution ==
Congo, Uganda, Rwanda, Zambia, Malawi, Lesotho, South Africa.
