= Paraspheniscoides senarius =

Scientific classification
- Kingdom: Animalia
- Phylum: Arthropoda
- Class: Insecta
- Order: Diptera
- Family: Tephritidae
- Subfamily: Tephritinae
- Tribe: Tephrellini
- Genus: Paraspheniscoides
- Species: P. senarius

Binomial name
- Paraspheniscoides senarius (Bezzi, 1924)

Synonyms
- Spheniscomyia senaria Bezzi, 1924

Species of fly

Paraspheniscoides senarius is a species of tephritid or fruit flies in the genus Paraspheniscoides of the family Tephritidae.

== Distribution ==
Congo, Uganda, Zambia, Namibia.
