= Pliomelaena sauteri =

Scientific classification
- Kingdom: Animalia
- Phylum: Arthropoda
- Clade: Pancrustacea
- Class: Insecta
- Order: Diptera
- Family: Tephritidae
- Subfamily: Tephritinae
- Tribe: Tephrellini
- Genus: Pliomelaena
- Species: P. sauteri

Binomial name
- Pliomelaena sauteri (Enderlein, 1911)

Synonyms
- Tephritis sauteri Enderlein, 1911

Species of fly

Pliomelaena sauteri is a species of tephritid or fruit flies in the genus Pliomelaena of the family Tephritidae.

== Distribution ==
The species is found in Taiwan and Indonesia.
