= Hyaloctoides superhyalinus =

Scientific classification
- Kingdom: Animalia
- Phylum: Arthropoda
- Class: Insecta
- Order: Diptera
- Family: Tephritidae
- Subfamily: Tephritinae
- Tribe: Tephrellini
- Genus: Hyaloctoides
- Species: H. superhyalinus

Binomial name
- Hyaloctoides superhyalinus (Munro, 1929)

Synonyms
- Spathulina semiatra var. superhyalina Munro, 1929

Species of fly

Hyaloctoides superhyalinus is a species of tephritid or fruit flies in the genus Hyaloctoides of the family Tephritidae.

== Distribution ==
Namibia.
