= Stephanotrypeta taeniaptera =

Scientific classification
- Kingdom: Animalia
- Phylum: Arthropoda
- Class: Insecta
- Order: Diptera
- Family: Tephritidae
- Subfamily: Tephritinae
- Tribe: Tephrellini
- Genus: Stephanotrypeta
- Species: S. taeniaptera

Binomial name
- Stephanotrypeta taeniaptera (Bezzi, 1923)

Synonyms
- Terellia taeniaptera Bezzi, 1923; Terellia taeniaptera Bezzi, 1924

Species of fly

Stephanotrypeta taeniaptera is a species of tephritid or fruit flies in the genus Stephanotrypeta of the family Tephritidae.

== Distribution ==
Congo, Uganda, Burundi, Kenya, Zimbabwe, South Africa.
