= Gymnaciura austeni =

Scientific classification
- Kingdom: Animalia
- Phylum: Arthropoda
- Class: Insecta
- Order: Diptera
- Family: Tephritidae
- Subfamily: Tephritinae
- Tribe: Tephrellini
- Genus: Gymnaciura
- Species: G. austeni

Binomial name
- Gymnaciura austeni (Munro, 1935)

Synonyms
- Spheniscomyia neavei var. chyuluensis Munro, 1939; Aciura distigmoides Hering, 1941; Gymnaciura austeni f. concisa Munro, 1955

Species of fly

Gymnaciura austeni is a species of tephritid or fruit flies in the genus Gymnaciura of the family Tephritidae.

== Distribution ==
Eritrea, Sierra Leone, Kenya, Tanzania, Zimbabwe, Madagascar.
