= Platensina parvipuncta =

Scientific classification
- Kingdom: Animalia
- Phylum: Arthropoda
- Clade: Pancrustacea
- Class: Insecta
- Order: Diptera
- Family: Tephritidae
- Subfamily: Tephritinae
- Tribe: Tephrellini
- Genus: Platensina
- Species: P. parvipuncta

Binomial name
- Platensina parvipuncta Malloch, 1939

Species of fly

Platensina parvipuncta is a species of tephritid or fruit flies in the genus Platensina of the family Tephritidae.

== Distribution ==
Australia.
