= Tephraciura phantasma =

Scientific classification
- Kingdom: Animalia
- Phylum: Arthropoda
- Class: Insecta
- Order: Diptera
- Family: Tephritidae
- Subfamily: Tephritinae
- Tribe: Tephrellini
- Genus: Tephraciura
- Species: T. phantasma

Binomial name
- Tephraciura phantasma (Hering, 1935)

Synonyms
- Tephrella phantasma Hering, 1935

Species of fly

Tephraciura phantasma is a species of tephritid or fruit flies in the genus Tephraciura of the family Tephritidae.

== Distribution ==
Namibia.
