= Elaphromyia fissa =

Scientific classification
- Kingdom: Animalia
- Phylum: Arthropoda
- Class: Insecta
- Order: Diptera
- Family: Tephritidae
- Subfamily: Tephritinae
- Tribe: Tephrellini
- Genus: Elaphromyia
- Species: E. fissa

Binomial name
- Elaphromyia fissa Munro, 1957

Species of fly

Elaphromyia fissa is a species of tephritid or fruit flies in the genus Elaphromyia of the family Tephritidae.

== Distribution ==
South Africa.
