= Pseudafreutreta bicolor =

Scientific classification
- Kingdom: Animalia
- Phylum: Arthropoda
- Class: Insecta
- Order: Diptera
- Family: Tephritidae
- Subfamily: Tephritinae
- Tribe: Tephrellini
- Genus: Pseudafreutreta
- Species: P. bicolor

Binomial name
- Pseudafreutreta bicolor Munro, 1957

Species of fly

Pseudafreutreta bicolor is a species of tephritid or fruit flies in the genus Pseudafreutreta of the family Tephritidae.

== Distribution ==
Uganda.
