= Cesaspheniscus debskii =

Scientific classification
- Kingdom: Animalia
- Phylum: Arthropoda
- Class: Insecta
- Order: Diptera
- Family: Tephritidae
- Subfamily: Tephritinae
- Tribe: Tephrellini
- Genus: Cesaspheniscus
- Species: C. debskii

Binomial name
- Cesaspheniscus debskii (Efflatoun, 1924)

Synonyms
- Spheniscomyia debskii Efflatoun, 1924

Species of fly

Cesaspheniscus debskii is a species of tephritid or fruit flies in the genus Cesaspheniscus of the family Tephritidae.

== Distribution ==
Egypt, Israel.
