= Psednometopum nigritum =

Scientific classification
- Kingdom: Animalia
- Phylum: Arthropoda
- Class: Insecta
- Order: Diptera
- Family: Tephritidae
- Subfamily: Tephritinae
- Tribe: Tephrellini
- Genus: Psednometopum
- Species: P. nigritum

Binomial name
- Psednometopum nigritum Munro, 1937

Synonyms
- Psedonmetopum aldabrensis var. nigritum Munro, 1937

Species of fly

Psednometopum nigritum is a species of tephritid or fruit flies in the genus Psednometopum of the family Tephritidae.

== Distribution ==
Kenya, Zimbabwe, South Africa.
