= Metasphenisca haematopoda =

Scientific classification
- Kingdom: Animalia
- Phylum: Arthropoda
- Class: Insecta
- Order: Diptera
- Family: Tephritidae
- Subfamily: Tephritinae
- Tribe: Tephrellini
- Genus: Metasphenisca
- Species: M. haematopoda

Binomial name
- Metasphenisca haematopoda (Bezzi, 1924)

Synonyms
- Aciura tetrachaeta var. haematopoda Bezzi, 1924

Species of fly

Metasphenisca haematopoda is a species of tephritid or fruit flies in the genus Metasphenisca of the family Tephritidae.

== Distribution ==
Egypt, Sudan, Namibia.
