= Tephraciura flavimacula =

Scientific classification
- Kingdom: Animalia
- Phylum: Arthropoda
- Class: Insecta
- Order: Diptera
- Family: Tephritidae
- Subfamily: Tephritinae
- Tribe: Tephrellini
- Genus: Tephraciura
- Species: T. flavimacula

Binomial name
- Tephraciura flavimacula Hancock, 1991

Species of fly

Tephraciura flavimacula is a species of tephritid or fruit flies in the genus Tephraciura of the family Tephritidae.

== Distribution ==
Madagascar.
