= Elaphromyia yunnanensis =

Scientific classification
- Kingdom: Animalia
- Phylum: Arthropoda
- Class: Insecta
- Order: Diptera
- Family: Tephritidae
- Subfamily: Tephritinae
- Tribe: Tephrellini
- Genus: Elaphromyia
- Species: E. yunnanensis

Binomial name
- Elaphromyia yunnanensis Wang, 1990

Species of fly

Elaphromyia yunnanensis is a species of tephritid or fruit flies in the genus Elaphromyia of the family Tephritidae.

== Distribution ==
China.
