= Sphaeniscus filiolus =

Scientific classification
- Kingdom: Animalia
- Phylum: Arthropoda
- Class: Insecta
- Order: Diptera
- Family: Tephritidae
- Subfamily: Tephritinae
- Tribe: Tephrellini
- Genus: Sphaeniscus
- Species: S. filiolus

Binomial name
- Sphaeniscus filiolus (Loew, 1869)

Synonyms
- Aciura filiola Loew, 1869; Sphaeniscus brevicauda Becker, 1908; Spheniscomyia aegyptiaca Efflatoun, 1924

Species of fly

Sphaeniscus filiolus is a species of tephritid or fruit flies in the genus Sphaeniscus of the family Tephritidae.

== Distribution ==
The species is distributed throughout Europe, Israel, Egypt, Canary Islands, Ethiopia.
