= Metasphenisca transilis =

Scientific classification
- Kingdom: Animalia
- Phylum: Arthropoda
- Class: Insecta
- Order: Diptera
- Family: Tephritidae
- Subfamily: Tephritinae
- Tribe: Tephrellini
- Genus: Metasphenisca
- Species: M. transilis

Binomial name
- Metasphenisca transilis Munro, 1947

Species of fly

Metasphenisca transilis is a species of tephritid or fruit flies in the genus Metasphenisca of the family Tephritidae.

== Distribution ==
Ethiopia, Sudan, Kenya, Malawi, Mozambique.
