= Sphaeniscus atilius =

Scientific classification
- Kingdom: Animalia
- Phylum: Arthropoda
- Class: Insecta
- Order: Diptera
- Family: Tephritidae
- Subfamily: Tephritinae
- Tribe: Tephrellini
- Genus: Sphaeniscus
- Species: S. atilius

Binomial name
- Sphaeniscus atilius (Walker, 1849)

Synonyms
- Trypeta atilia Walker, 1849; Trypeta formosana Enderlein, 1911; Trypeta melaleuca Walker, 1864; Trypeta sexincisa Thomson, 1869

Species of fly

Sphaeniscus atilius is a species of tephritid or fruit flies in the genus Sphaeniscus of the family Tephritidae.

== Distribution ==
They are found in India, Siberia, Japan, and southeast Australasia.
