= Metasphenisca longulior =

Scientific classification
- Kingdom: Animalia
- Phylum: Arthropoda
- Class: Insecta
- Order: Diptera
- Family: Tephritidae
- Subfamily: Tephritinae
- Tribe: Tephrellini
- Genus: Metasphenisca
- Species: M. longulior

Binomial name
- Metasphenisca longulior (Munro, 1929)

Synonyms
- Aciura longulior Munro, 1929

Species of fly

Metasphenisca longulior is a species of tephritid or fruit flies in the genus Metasphenisca of the family Tephritidae.

== Distribution ==
Kenya, Zambia, Namibia, South Africa.
