= Elaphromyia incompleta =

Scientific classification
- Kingdom: Animalia
- Phylum: Arthropoda
- Class: Insecta
- Order: Diptera
- Family: Tephritidae
- Subfamily: Tephritinae
- Tribe: Tephrellini
- Genus: Elaphromyia
- Species: E. incompleta

Binomial name
- Elaphromyia incompleta Shiraki, 1933

Synonyms
- Elaphromyia incompleta ssp. punctata Shiraki, 1968

Species of fly

Elaphromyia incompleta is a species of tephritid or fruit flies in the genus Elaphromyia of the family Tephritidae.

== Distribution ==
China, Japan.
