= Metasphenisca gracilipes =

Scientific classification
- Kingdom: Animalia
- Phylum: Arthropoda
- Class: Insecta
- Order: Diptera
- Family: Tephritidae
- Subfamily: Tephritinae
- Tribe: Tephrellini
- Genus: Metasphenisca
- Species: M. gracilipes

Binomial name
- Metasphenisca gracilipes (Loew, 1862)

Synonyms
- Trypeta gracilipes Loew, 1862; Acidia cyclopica Bezzi, 1908; Trypeta w-fuscum Enderlein, 1911

Species of fly

Metasphenisca gracilipes is a species of tephritid or fruit flies in the genus Metasphenisca of the family Tephritidae.

== Distribution ==
Egypt, Eritrea, South Africa.
