= Hyaloctoides gorgoneus =

Scientific classification
- Kingdom: Animalia
- Phylum: Arthropoda
- Class: Insecta
- Order: Diptera
- Family: Tephritidae
- Subfamily: Tephritinae
- Tribe: Tephrellini
- Genus: Hyaloctoides
- Species: H. gorgoneus

Binomial name
- Hyaloctoides gorgoneus Hering, 1958

Synonyms
- Hyaloctoides semiater ssp. gorgonea Hering, 1958

Species of fly

Hyaloctoides gorgoneus is a species of tephritid or fruit flies in the genus Hyaloctoides of the family Tephritidae.

== Distribution ==
Cape Verde Islands.
