= Ypsilomena compacta =

Scientific classification
- Kingdom: Animalia
- Phylum: Arthropoda
- Class: Insecta
- Order: Diptera
- Family: Tephritidae
- Subfamily: Tephritinae
- Tribe: Tephrellini
- Genus: Ypsilomena
- Species: Y. compacta

Binomial name
- Ypsilomena compacta Bezzi, 1924

Synonyms
- Spheniscomyia compacta Bezzi, 1924

Species of fly

Ypsilomena compacta is a species of tephritid or fruit flies in the genus Ypsilomena of the family Tephritidae.

== Distribution ==
Tanzania, Kenya, Zimbabwe, South Africa.
