= Metasphenisca interrupta =

Scientific classification
- Kingdom: Animalia
- Phylum: Arthropoda
- Class: Insecta
- Order: Diptera
- Family: Tephritidae
- Subfamily: Tephritinae
- Tribe: Tephrellini
- Genus: Metasphenisca
- Species: M. interrupta

Binomial name
- Metasphenisca interrupta (Munro, 1929)

Synonyms
- Aciura tetrachaeta var. interrupta Munro, 1929

Species of fly

Metasphenisca interrupta is a species of tephritid or fruit flies in the genus Metasphenisca of the family Tephritidae.

== Distribution ==
Zambia, South Africa.
