= Sphaeniscus trifasciatus =

Scientific classification
- Kingdom: Animalia
- Phylum: Arthropoda
- Class: Insecta
- Order: Diptera
- Family: Tephritidae
- Subfamily: Tephritinae
- Tribe: Tephrellini
- Genus: Sphaeniscus
- Species: S. trifasciatus

Binomial name
- Sphaeniscus trifasciatus Korneyev & Dirlbek, 2000

Species of fly

Sphaeniscus trifasciatus is a species of tephritid or fruit flies in the genus Sphaeniscus of the family Tephritidae.

== Distribution ==
Sphaeniscus trifasciatus is found in Jordan.
