= Paraspheniscoides binarius =

Scientific classification
- Kingdom: Animalia
- Phylum: Arthropoda
- Class: Insecta
- Order: Diptera
- Family: Tephritidae
- Subfamily: Tephritinae
- Tribe: Tephrellini
- Genus: Paraspheniscoides
- Species: P. binarius

Binomial name
- Paraspheniscoides binarius (Loew, 1861)

Synonyms
- Trypeta binaria Loew, 1861; Trypeta binaria Loew, 1862; Notoxesis binaria var. adepta Munro, 1947; Notoxesis binaria var. septa Munro, 1947; Paraspheniscoides binarius var. adaptus Cogan & Munro, 1980

Species of fly

Paraspheniscoides binarius is a species of tephritid or fruit flies in the genus Paraspheniscoides of the family Tephritidae.

== Distribution ==
Ethiopia South to Namibia & South Africa, Madagascar, Mauritius, Réunion.
