= Tephraciura angusta =

Scientific classification
- Kingdom: Animalia
- Phylum: Arthropoda
- Class: Insecta
- Order: Diptera
- Family: Tephritidae
- Subfamily: Tephritinae
- Tribe: Tephrellini
- Genus: Tephraciura
- Species: T. angusta

Binomial name
- Tephraciura angusta (Loew, 1861)

Synonyms
- Trypeta angusta Loew, 1861; Trypeta angusta Loew, 1862

Species of fly

Tephraciura angusta is a species of tephritid or fruit flies in the genus Tephraciura of the family Tephritidae.

== Distribution ==
Ethiopia, Burundi, Kenya, Namibia, South Africa, Socotra.
