= Pliomelaena assimilis =

Scientific classification
- Kingdom: Animalia
- Phylum: Arthropoda
- Class: Insecta
- Order: Diptera
- Family: Tephritidae
- Subfamily: Tephritinae
- Tribe: Tephrellini
- Genus: Pliomelaena
- Species: P. assimilis

Binomial name
- Pliomelaena assimilis (Shiraki, 1968)

Synonyms
- Protephritis assimilis Shiraki, 1968

Species of fly

Pliomelaena assimilis is a species of tephritid or fruit flies in the genus Pliomelaena of the family Tephritidae.

== Distribution ==
Japan, Taiwan.
