= Sundaresta hilaris =

Scientific classification
- Kingdom: Animalia
- Phylum: Arthropoda
- Class: Insecta
- Order: Diptera
- Family: Tephritidae
- Subfamily: Tephritinae
- Tribe: Tephrellini
- Genus: Sundaresta
- Species: S. hilaris

Binomial name
- Sundaresta hilaris Hering, 1953

Species of fruit fly

Sundaresta hilaris is a species of tephritid or fruit flies in the genus Sundaresta of the family Tephritidae. It is found in Indonesia.
