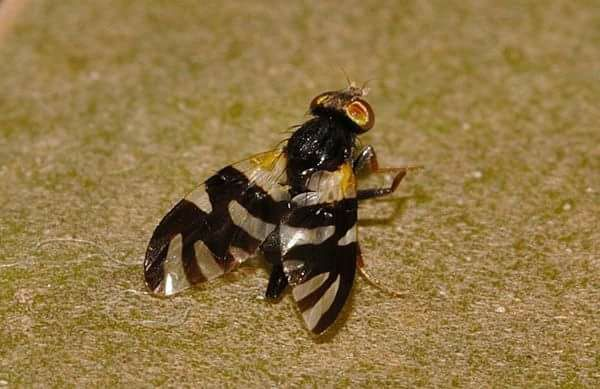
- A specimen from Zimbabwe

Scientific classification
- Kingdom: Animalia
- Phylum: Arthropoda
- Clade: Pancrustacea
- Class: Insecta
- Order: Diptera
- Family: Tephritidae
- Subfamily: Tephritinae
- Tribe: Tephrellini
- Genus: Sphaeniscus; Becker, 1908

Type species
- Sphaeniscus brevicauda Becker, 1908

Synonyms
- Pseudopheniscus Hendel, 1913; Pseudospheniscus Hendel, 1914; Pseuopspheniscus Shinji, 1939; Spheniscomyia Bezzi, 1913; Spheniscus Bezzi, 1913

= Sphaeniscus =

Genus of flies

Sphaeniscus is a genus of tephritid or fruit flies in the family Tephritidae.

== Species ==
- Sphaeniscus atilius (Walker, 1849)
- Sphaeniscus binoculatus (Bezzi, 1928)
- Sphaeniscus filiolus (Loew, 1869)
- Sphaeniscus lindbergi Hering, 1958
- Sphaeniscus melanotrichotus Hering, 1956
- Sphaeniscus quadrincisus (Wiedemann, 1824)
- Sphaeniscus sexmaculatus (Macquart, 1843)
- Sphaeniscus trifasciatus Korneyev & Dirlbek, 2000
