= Sphaeniscus lindbergi =

Scientific classification
- Kingdom: Animalia
- Phylum: Arthropoda
- Clade: Pancrustacea
- Class: Insecta
- Order: Diptera
- Family: Tephritidae
- Subfamily: Tephritinae
- Tribe: Tephrellini
- Genus: Sphaeniscus
- Species: S. lindbergi

Binomial name
- Sphaeniscus lindbergi Hering, 1958

Species of fly

Sphaeniscus lindbergi is a species of tephritid or fruit flies in the genus Sphaeniscus of the family Tephritidae.

== Distribution ==
It is found in Cape Verde.
