= Sphaeniscus melanotrichotus =

Scientific classification
- Kingdom: Animalia
- Phylum: Arthropoda
- Class: Insecta
- Order: Diptera
- Family: Tephritidae
- Subfamily: Tephritinae
- Tribe: Tephrellini
- Genus: Sphaeniscus
- Species: S. melanotrichotus

Binomial name
- Sphaeniscus melanotrichotus Hering, 1956

Species of fly

Sphaeniscus melanotrichotus is a species of tephritid or fruit flies in the genus Sphaeniscus of the family Tephritidae.

== Distribution ==
It is found in Sri Lanka.
