= Platensina trimaculata =

Scientific classification
- Kingdom: Animalia
- Phylum: Arthropoda
- Clade: Pancrustacea
- Class: Insecta
- Order: Diptera
- Family: Tephritidae
- Subfamily: Tephritinae
- Tribe: Tephrellini
- Genus: Platensina
- Species: P. trimaculata

Binomial name
- Platensina trimaculata Hardy & Drew, 1996

Species of fly

Platensina trimaculata is a species of tephritid or fruit flies in the genus Platensina of the family Tephritidae.

== Distribution ==
Australia.
