= Tephraciura pachmarica =

Scientific classification
- Kingdom: Animalia
- Phylum: Arthropoda
- Class: Insecta
- Order: Diptera
- Family: Tephritidae
- Subfamily: Tephritinae
- Tribe: Tephrellini
- Genus: Tephraciura
- Species: T. pachmarica

Binomial name
- Tephraciura pachmarica Agarwal & Kapoor, 1988

Species of fly

Tephraciura pachmarica is a species of tephritid or fruit flies in the genus Tephraciura of the family Tephritidae.

== Distribution ==
India.
