= Namibiocesa incana =

Scientific classification
- Kingdom: Animalia
- Phylum: Arthropoda
- Class: Insecta
- Order: Diptera
- Family: Tephritidae
- Subfamily: Tephritinae
- Tribe: Tephrellini
- Genus: Namibiocesa
- Species: N. incana

Binomial name
- Namibiocesa incana (Munro, 1963)

Synonyms
- Leucothrix incana' Munro, 1963

Species of fly

Namibiocesa incana is a species of tephritid or fruit flies in the genus Namibiocesa of the family Tephritidae.

== Distribution ==
South Africa.
