= Pliomelaena caeca =

Scientific classification
- Kingdom: Animalia
- Phylum: Arthropoda
- Class: Insecta
- Order: Diptera
- Family: Tephritidae
- Subfamily: Tephritinae
- Tribe: Tephrellini
- Genus: Pliomelaena
- Species: P. caeca

Binomial name
- Pliomelaena caeca Bezzi, 1924

Species of fly

Pliomelaena caeca is a species of tephritid or fruit flies in the genus Pliomelaena of the family Tephritidae.

== Distribution ==
Malawi.
