= Platensina intacta =

Scientific classification
- Kingdom: Animalia
- Phylum: Arthropoda
- Class: Insecta
- Order: Diptera
- Family: Tephritidae
- Subfamily: Tephritinae
- Tribe: Tephrellini
- Genus: Platensina
- Species: P. intacta

Binomial name
- Platensina intacta Hardy, 1973

Species of fly

Platensina intacta is a species of fruit fly in the family Tephritidae. It measures 4.75–5 mm (0.187–0.197 in) in body length.

== Distribution ==
The species is known from Thailand, Cambodia, and Vietnam.
