= Metasphenisca quinquemaculata =

Scientific classification
- Kingdom: Animalia
- Phylum: Arthropoda
- Class: Insecta
- Order: Diptera
- Family: Tephritidae
- Subfamily: Tephritinae
- Tribe: Tephrellini
- Genus: Metasphenisca
- Species: M. quinquemaculata

Binomial name
- Metasphenisca quinquemaculata (Macquart, 1846)

Synonyms
- Urophora quinquemaculata Macquart, 1846

Species of fly

Metasphenisca quinquemaculata is a species of tephritid or fruit flies in the genus Metasphenisca of the family Tephritidae.

== Distribution ==
Afrotropical Region.
