= Manicomyia chirindana =

Scientific classification
- Kingdom: Animalia
- Phylum: Arthropoda
- Class: Insecta
- Order: Diptera
- Family: Tephritidae
- Subfamily: Tephritinae
- Tribe: Tephrellini
- Genus: Manicomyia
- Species: M. chirindana

Binomial name
- Manicomyia chirindana (Munro, 1935)

Synonyms
- Afreutreta chirindana Munro, 1935

Species of fly

Manicomyia chirindana is a species of tephritid or fruit flies in the genus Manicomyia of the family Tephritidae.

== Distribution ==
Mozambique, Zimbabwe.
