= Ghentia millepunctatum =

Scientific classification
- Kingdom: Animalia
- Phylum: Arthropoda
- Clade: Pancrustacea
- Class: Insecta
- Order: Diptera
- Family: Tephritidae
- Subfamily: Tephritinae
- Tribe: Tephrellini
- Genus: Ghentia
- Species: G. millepunctatum

Binomial name
- Ghentia millepunctatum (Bezzi, 1913)

Synonyms
- Eutretosoma millepunctatum Bezzi, 1926; Afreutreta millepunctata var. limbatella Bezzi, 1913

Species of fly

Ghentia millepunctatum is a species of tephritid or fruit flies in the genus Ghentia of the family Tephritidae.

== Distribution ==
Eritrea, South Africa.
