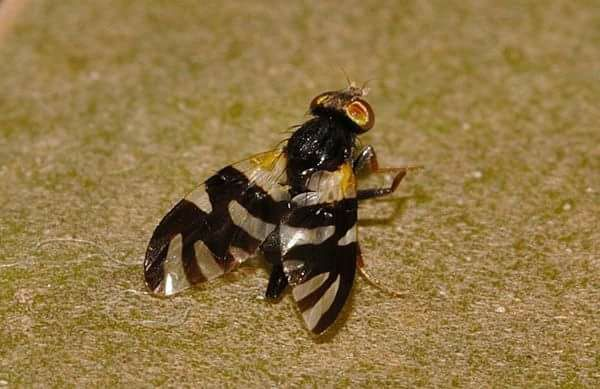
- Specimen in Zimbabwe

Scientific classification
- Kingdom: Animalia
- Phylum: Arthropoda
- Class: Insecta
- Order: Diptera
- Family: Tephritidae
- Subfamily: Tephritinae
- Tribe: Tephrellini
- Genus: Sphaeniscus
- Species: S. sexmaculatus

Binomial name
- Sphaeniscus sexmaculatus (Macquart, 1843)

Synonyms
- Urophora sexmaculata Macquart, 1843; Acidia melania Bezzi, 1908; Acidia melanica Shiraki, 1933; Ortalis sanctaemariae Bigot, 1860

= Sphaeniscus sexmaculatus =

Species of fly

Sphaeniscus sexmaculatus is a species of tephritid or fruit flies in the genus Sphaeniscus of the family Tephritidae.

== Distribution ==
Sphaeniscus sexmaculatus is distributed from Sudan South to South Africa, Madagascar, Réunion, Mauritius.
