= Ocnerioxyna hemilea =

Scientific classification
- Kingdom: Animalia
- Phylum: Arthropoda
- Class: Insecta
- Order: Diptera
- Family: Tephritidae
- Subfamily: Tephritinae
- Tribe: Tephrellini
- Genus: Ocnerioxyna
- Species: O. hemilea

Binomial name
- Ocnerioxyna hemilea Séguy, 1939

Species of fly

Ocnerioxyna hemilea is a species of tephritid or fruit flies in the genus Ocnerioxyna of the family Tephritidae.

== Distribution ==
Ethiopia.
