= Platensina acrostacta =

Scientific classification
- Kingdom: Animalia
- Phylum: Arthropoda
- Clade: Pancrustacea
- Class: Insecta
- Order: Diptera
- Family: Tephritidae
- Subfamily: Tephritinae
- Tribe: Tephrellini
- Genus: Platensina
- Species: P. acrostacta

Binomial name
- Platensina acrostacta (Wiedemann, 1824)

Synonyms
- Tephritis acrostacta Wiedemann, 1824; Ensina guttata Macquart, 1843; Trypeta stella Walker, 1849

Species of fly

Platensina acrostacta is a species of tephritid or fruit flies in the genus Platensina of the family Tephritidae.

== Distribution ==
Pakistan, India, Sri Lanka, Bangladesh, Thailand, Cambodia.
