= Tephrella decipiens =

Scientific classification
- Kingdom: Animalia
- Phylum: Arthropoda
- Class: Insecta
- Order: Diptera
- Family: Tephritidae
- Subfamily: Tephritinae
- Tribe: Tephrellini
- Genus: Tephrella
- Species: T. decipiens

Binomial name
- Tephrella decipiens Bezzi, 1913

Species of fly

Tephrella decipiens is a species of tephritid or fruit flies in the genus Tephrella of the family Tephritidae.

== Distribution ==
India, Myanmar.
