= Pliomelaena parviguttata =

Scientific classification
- Kingdom: Animalia
- Phylum: Arthropoda
- Class: Insecta
- Order: Diptera
- Family: Tephritidae
- Subfamily: Tephritinae
- Tribe: Tephrellini
- Genus: Pliomelaena
- Species: P. parviguttata

Binomial name
- Pliomelaena parviguttata Hering, 1952

Species of fly

Pliomelaena parviguttata is a species of tephritid or fruit flies in the genus Pliomelaena of the family Tephritidae.

== Distribution ==
Ethiopia.
