= Platensina diaphasis =

Scientific classification
- Kingdom: Animalia
- Phylum: Arthropoda
- Class: Insecta
- Order: Diptera
- Family: Tephritidae
- Subfamily: Tephritinae
- Tribe: Tephrellini
- Genus: Platensina
- Species: P. diaphasis

Binomial name
- Platensina diaphasis (Bigot, 1891)

Synonyms
- Aedaspis diaphasis Bigot, 1891; Euaresta strictifrons Bezzi, 1918; Pliomelaena stigmatica Bezzi, 1924

Species of fly

Platensina diaphasis is a species of tephritid or fruit flies in the genus Platensina of the family Tephritidae.

== Distribution ==
Ivory Coast & Tanzania to South Africa, Madagascar.
