= Pseudafreutreta fatua =

Scientific classification
- Kingdom: Animalia
- Phylum: Arthropoda
- Class: Insecta
- Order: Diptera
- Family: Tephritidae
- Subfamily: Tephritinae
- Tribe: Tephrellini
- Genus: Pseudafreutreta
- Species: P. fatua

Binomial name
- Pseudafreutreta fatua Hering, 1942

Species of fly

Pseudafreutreta fatua is a species of tephritid or fruit flies in the genus Pseudafreutreta of the family Tephritidae.

== Distribution ==
Ghana, Nigeria, Cameroon.
