= Tephrelalis sexincisa =

Scientific classification
- Kingdom: Animalia
- Phylum: Arthropoda
- Class: Insecta
- Order: Diptera
- Family: Tephritidae
- Subfamily: Tephritinae
- Tribe: Tephrellini
- Genus: Tephrelalis
- Species: T. sexincisa

Binomial name
- Tephrelalis sexincisa Korneyev, 1993

Species of fly

Tephrelalis sexincisa is a species of tephritid or fruit flies in the genus Tephrelalis of the family Tephritidae.

== Distribution ==
Russia.
