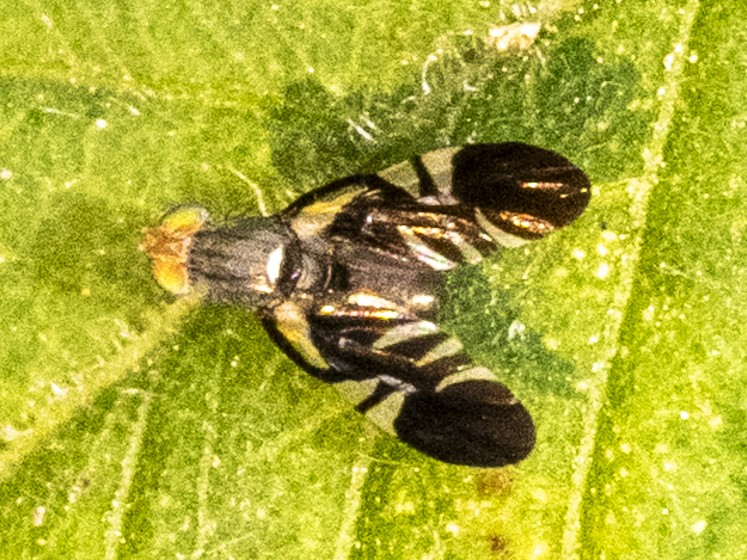

Scientific classification
- Kingdom: Animalia
- Phylum: Arthropoda
- Clade: Pancrustacea
- Class: Insecta
- Order: Diptera
- Family: Tephritidae
- Subfamily: Tephritinae
- Tribe: Tephrellini
- Genus: Metasphenisca
- Species: M. reinhardi

Binomial name
- Metasphenisca reinhardi (Wiedemann, 1824)

Synonyms
- Tephritis reinhardi Wiedemann, 1824; Metasphenisca malayana Hering, 1942

= Metasphenisca reinhardi =

Species of fly

Metasphenisca reinhardi is a species of tephritid or fruit fly in the family Tephritidae.

== Distribution ==
Pakistan, India, Sri Lanka, Myanmar, Cambodia.
