= Elaphromyia multisetosa =

Scientific classification
- Kingdom: Animalia
- Phylum: Arthropoda
- Class: Insecta
- Order: Diptera
- Family: Tephritidae
- Subfamily: Tephritinae
- Tribe: Tephrellini
- Genus: Elaphromyia
- Species: E. multisetosa

Binomial name
- Elaphromyia multisetosa Shiraki, 1933

Species of fly

Elaphromyia multisetosa is a species of tephritid or fruit flies in the genus Elaphromyia of the family Tephritidae.

== Distribution ==
China, Taiwan.
