= Platensina tetrica =

Scientific classification
- Kingdom: Animalia
- Phylum: Arthropoda
- Class: Insecta
- Order: Diptera
- Family: Tephritidae
- Subfamily: Tephritinae
- Tribe: Tephrellini
- Genus: Platensina
- Species: P. tetrica

Binomial name
- Platensina tetrica Hering, 1939

Species of fly

Platensina tetrica is a species of fruit fly in the family Tephritidae. It measures 3.75–4 mm (0.148–0.157 in) in length.

== Distribution ==
The species is known from India, Vietnam, and Peninsular Malaysia.
