= Hyaloctoides semiater =

Scientific classification
- Kingdom: Animalia
- Phylum: Arthropoda
- Class: Insecta
- Order: Diptera
- Family: Tephritidae
- Subfamily: Tephritinae
- Tribe: Tephrellini
- Genus: Hyaloctoides
- Species: H. semiater

Binomial name
- Hyaloctoides semiater (Loew, 1861)

Synonyms
- Trypeta semiatra Loew, 1861

Species of fly

Hyaloctoides semiater is a species of tephritid or fruit flies in the genus Hyaloctoides of the family Tephritidae.

== Distribution ==
Ethiopia, Kenya, Malawi, Mozambique, Zimbabwe, South Africa.
