= Gymnaciura neavei =

Scientific classification
- Kingdom: Animalia
- Phylum: Arthropoda
- Class: Insecta
- Order: Diptera
- Family: Tephritidae
- Subfamily: Tephritinae
- Tribe: Tephrellini
- Genus: Gymnaciura
- Species: G. neavei

Binomial name
- Gymnaciura neavei (Bezzi, 1920)

Species of fly

Gymnaciura neavei is a species of tephritid or fruit flies in the genus Gymnaciura of the family Tephritidae.

== Distribution ==
Malawi, Zimbabwe.
