= Hyaloctoides bioculatus =

Scientific classification
- Kingdom: Animalia
- Phylum: Arthropoda
- Class: Insecta
- Order: Diptera
- Family: Tephritidae
- Subfamily: Tephritinae
- Tribe: Tephrellini
- Genus: Hyaloctoides
- Species: H. bioculatus

Binomial name
- Hyaloctoides bioculatus (Bezzi, 1920)

Synonyms
- Spathulina bioculatus Bezzi, 1920

Species of fly

Hyaloctoides bioculatus is a species of tephritid or fruit flies in the genus Hyaloctoides of the family Tephritidae.

== Distribution ==
Nigeria.
