= Sphaeniscus quadrincisus =

Scientific classification
- Kingdom: Animalia
- Phylum: Arthropoda
- Clade: Pancrustacea
- Class: Insecta
- Order: Diptera
- Family: Tephritidae
- Subfamily: Tephritinae
- Tribe: Tephrellini
- Genus: Sphaeniscus
- Species: S. quadrincisus

Binomial name
- Sphaeniscus quadrincisus (Wiedemann, 1824)

Synonyms
- Tephritis quadrincisa Wiedemann, 1824; Trypeta tucia Walker, 1849; Trypeta tacia Wulp, 1896; Euxesta parvula Wulp, 1897

Species of fly

Sphaeniscus quadrincisus is a species of tephritid or fruit flies in the genus Sphaeniscus of the family Tephritidae.

== Distribution ==
Sphaeniscus quadrincisus can be found in India, Sri Lanka, South China, Taiwan.
