= Psednometopum aldabrense =

Scientific classification
- Kingdom: Animalia
- Phylum: Arthropoda
- Class: Insecta
- Order: Diptera
- Family: Tephritidae
- Subfamily: Tephritinae
- Tribe: Tephrellini
- Genus: Psednometopum
- Species: P. aldabrense

Binomial name
- Psednometopum aldabrense (Lamb, 1914)

Synonyms
- Tephritis aldabrensis Lamb, 1914

Species of fly

Psednometopum aldabrense is a species of tephritid or fruit flies in the genus Psednometopum of the family Tephritidae.

== Distribution ==
Seychelles.
