= Elaphromyia transversa =

Scientific classification
- Kingdom: Animalia
- Phylum: Arthropoda
- Clade: Pancrustacea
- Class: Insecta
- Order: Diptera
- Family: Tephritidae
- Subfamily: Tephritinae
- Tribe: Tephrellini
- Genus: Elaphromyia
- Species: E. transversa

Binomial name
- Elaphromyia transversa Hardy, 1988

Species of fly

Elaphromyia transversa is a species of tephritid or fruit flies in the genus Elaphromyia of the family Tephritidae.

== Distribution ==
Elaphromyia transversa is known from Papua New Guinea, where it has been recorded in Morobe Province, including Wau.
