= Platensina amplipennis =

Scientific classification
- Kingdom: Animalia
- Phylum: Arthropoda
- Class: Insecta
- Order: Diptera
- Family: Tephritidae
- Subfamily: Tephritinae
- Tribe: Tephrellini
- Genus: Platensina
- Species: P. amplipennis

Binomial name
- Platensina amplipennis (Walker, 1860)

Synonyms
- Trypeta amplipennis Walker, 1860; Platensina amplissima Osten Sacken, 1882; Platensina platyptera Hendel, 1915; Platensina malaita Curran, 1936; Platensina dubia Malloch, 1939; Platensina dilatata Hering, 1941

Species of fly

Platensina amplipennis is a species of tephritid or fruit flies in the genus Platensina of the family Tephritidae.

== Distribution ==
India & Taiwan SE to Australia & Solomon Islands, Guam, Micronesia, Northern Mariana Islands.
