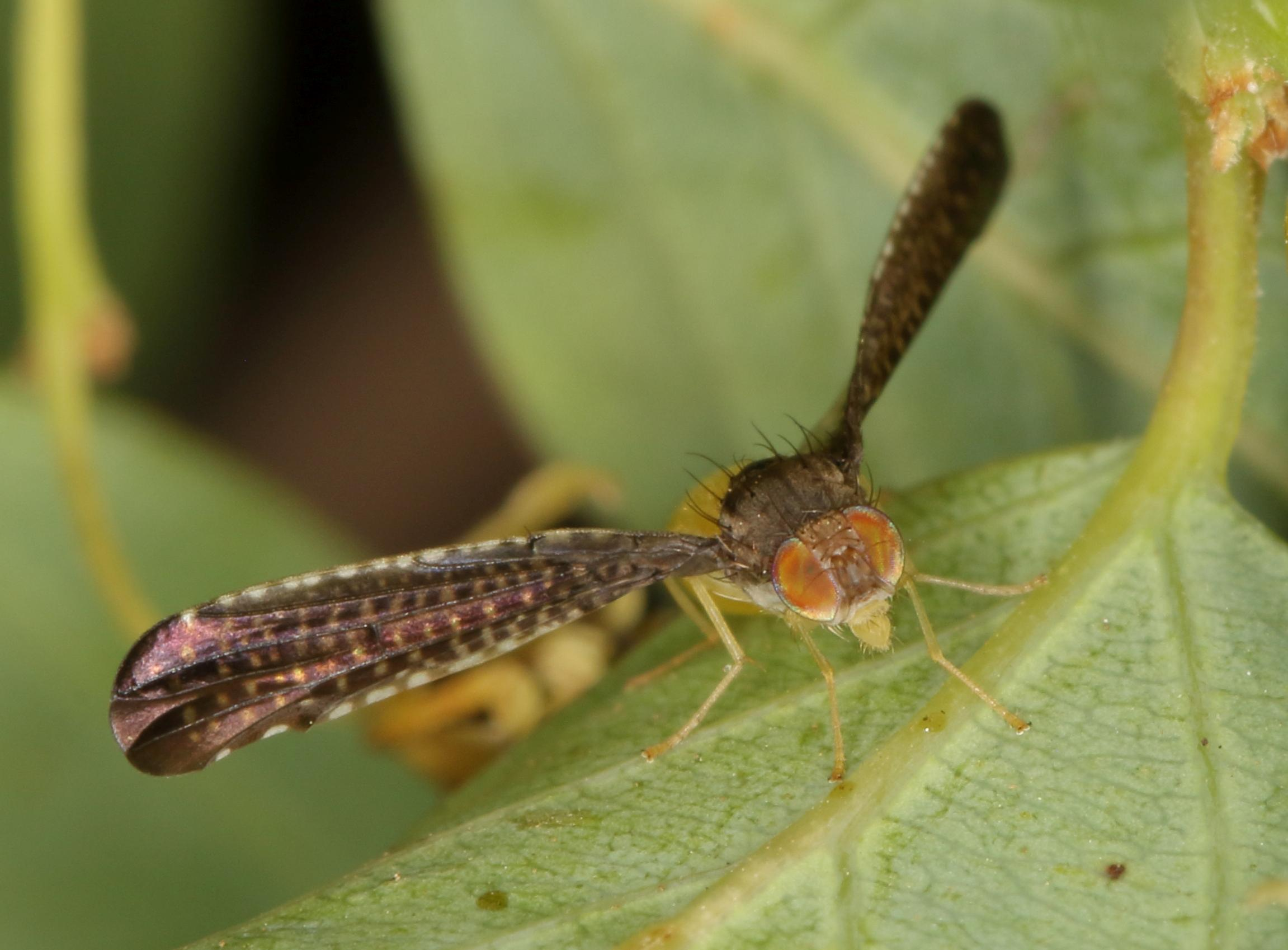

Scientific classification
- Kingdom: Animalia
- Phylum: Arthropoda
- Class: Insecta
- Order: Diptera
- Family: Tephritidae
- Subfamily: Tephritinae
- Tribe: Tephrellini
- Genus: Elaphromyia
- Species: E. adatha

Binomial name
- Elaphromyia adatha (Walker, 1849)

Synonyms
- Trypeta adatha Walker, 1849; Elaphromyia melas Bigot, 1859; Trypeta ulula Loew, 1861; Trypeta ulula Loew, 1862

= Elaphromyia adatha =

Species of fly

Elaphromyia adatha is a species of tephritid or fruit flies in the genus Elaphromyia of the family Tephritidae.

== Distribution ==
Congo, Zimbabwe, Mozambique, Botswana, South Africa.
