= Manicomyia =

Scientific classification
- Kingdom: Animalia
- Phylum: Arthropoda
- Class: Insecta
- Order: Diptera
- Family: Tephritidae
- Subfamily: Tephritinae
- Tribe: Tephrellini
- Genus: Manicomyia; Hancock, 1986

Type species
- Afreutreta chirindana (Munro, 1935)

Genus of flies

Manicomyia is a genus of tephritid or fruit flies in the family Tephritidae.

== Species ==
- Manicomyia chirindana Munro, 1935
