= Platensina =

Scientific classification
- Kingdom: Animalia
- Phylum: Arthropoda
- Clade: Pancrustacea
- Class: Insecta
- Order: Diptera
- Family: Tephritidae
- Subfamily: Tephritinae
- Tribe: Tephrellini
- Genus: Platensina; Enderlein, 1911

Type species
- Platensina sumbana Enderlein, 1911

Synonyms
- Platensia Shinji, 1940; Tephrostola Bezzi, 1913

Genus of flies

Platensina is a genus of tephritid or fruit flies in the family Tephritidae.

== Species ==
- Platensina acrostacta (Wiedemann, 1824)
- Platensina alboapicalis Hering, 1938
- Platensina amita Hardy, 1974
- Platensina ampla Meijere, 1914
- Platensina amplipennis (Walker, 1860)
- Platensina apicalis Hendel, 1915
- Platensina aptata Hardy, 1974
- Platensina bezzii Hardy, 1974
- Platensina diaphasis (Bigot, 1891)
- Platensina euryptera (Bezzi, 1913)
- Platensina flavistigma David & Hancock, 2022
- Platensina fukienica Hering, 1939
- Platensina fulvifacies Hering, 1941
- Platensina guttatolimbata (Enderlein, 1911)
- Platensina intacta Hardy, 1973
- Platensina katangana Munro, 1937
- Platensina nigrodiscalis Munro, 1947
- Platensina parvipuncta Malloch, 1939
- Platensina quadrula Hardy, 1973
- Platensina rabbanii David & Hancock, 2022
- Platensina sumbana Enderlein, 1911
- Platensina tetrica Hering, 1939
- Platensina trimaculata Hardy & Drew, 1996
- Platensina voneda (Walker, 1849)
- Platensina woodi (Bezzi, 1924)
- Platensina zodiacalis (Bezzi, 1913)
