= Ocnerioxyna =

Scientific classification
- Kingdom: Animalia
- Phylum: Arthropoda
- Class: Insecta
- Order: Diptera
- Family: Tephritidae
- Subfamily: Tephritinae
- Tribe: Tephrellini
- Genus: Ocnerioxyna; Séguy, 1939

Type species
- Ocnerioxyna hemilea Séguy, 1939

Synonyms
- Allotrypes Bezzi, 1920 (Preocc.); Allotrypomyia Cogan & Munro, 1980

Genus of flies

Ocnerioxyna is a genus of tephritid or fruit flies in the family Tephritidae.

== Species ==
- Ocnerioxyna gracilis (Loew, 1861)
- Ocnerioxyna hemilea (Séguy, 1939)
- Ocnerioxyna maripilosa (Munro, 1947)
