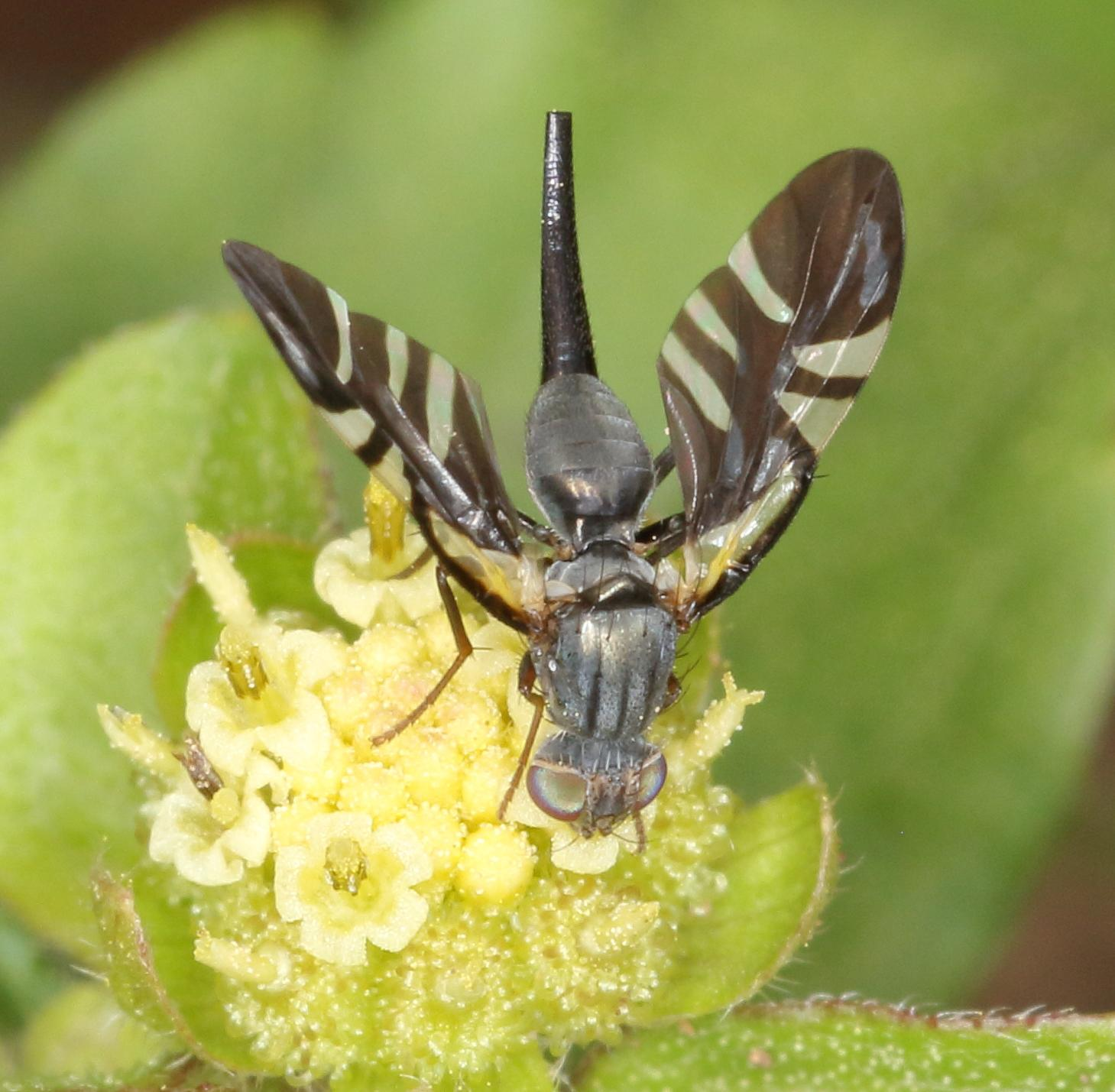
- Metasphenisca tetrachaeta

Scientific classification
- Kingdom: Animalia
- Phylum: Arthropoda
- Clade: Pancrustacea
- Class: Insecta
- Order: Diptera
- Family: Tephritidae
- Subfamily: Tephritinae
- Tribe: Tephrellini
- Genus: Metasphenisca; Hendel, 1914

Type species
- Trypeta gracilipes Loew, 1862

Synonyms
- Isoconia Munro, 1947

= Metasphenisca =

Genus of flies

Metasphenisca is a genus of fruit flies in the family Tephritidae. There are at least 25 described species in the Afrotropical and Oriental Regions. Of these, 20 occur in the continental Afrotropics and two are confined to Madagascar; three species occur in the Arabian Peninsula.

== Species ==
- Metasphenisca atricomata Munro, 1947
- Metasphenisca axilatra Munro, 1947
- Metasphenisca bezziana (Enderlein, 1911)
- Metasphenisca bifaria Munro, 1947
- Metasphenisca caeca (Bezzi, 1908)
- Metasphenisca discocephala Munro, 1947
- Metasphenisca ghenti Munro, 1947
- Metasphenisca gracilipes (Loew, 1862)
- Metasphenisca grandidieri (Bezzi, 1924)
- Metasphenisca haematopoda (Bezzi, 1924)
- Metasphenisca hazelae Munro, 1947
- Metasphenisca interrupta (Munro, 1929)
- Metasphenisca longulior (Munro, 1929)
- Metasphenisca marmorea Munro, 1947
- Metasphenisca micrura Hering, 1942
- Metasphenisca negeviana (Freidberg, 1974)
- Metasphenisca nigricans (Wiedemann, 1830)
- Metasphenisca nigricosta (Bezzi, 1908)
- Metasphenisca nigriseta (Bezzi, 1924)
- Metasphenisca pallidifemur Hancock, 1991
- Metasphenisca parallela Hering, 1935
- Metasphenisca parilis Munro, 1947
- Metasphenisca quinquemaculata (Macquart, 1846)
- Metasphenisca reinhardi (Wiedemann, 1824)
- Metasphenisca rubida Munro, 1947
- Metasphenisca spathuliniforma Dirlbek & Dirlbek, 1968
- Metasphenisca tetrachaeta (Bezzi, 1918)
- Metasphenisca transilis Munro, 1947
- Metasphenisca zernyi Hering, 1941
