= Psednometopum =

Scientific classification
- Kingdom: Animalia
- Phylum: Arthropoda
- Class: Insecta
- Order: Diptera
- Family: Tephritidae
- Subfamily: Tephritinae
- Tribe: Tephrellini
- Genus: Psednometopum; Munro, 1937

Type species
- Tephritis aldabrensis Lamb, 1914

Synonyms
- Psedonmetopum Munro, 1937

Genus of flies

Psednometopum is a genus of tephritid or fruit flies in the family Tephritidae.

== Species ==
- Psednometopum aldabrense (Lamb, 1914)
- Psednometopum nigritum Munro, 1937
