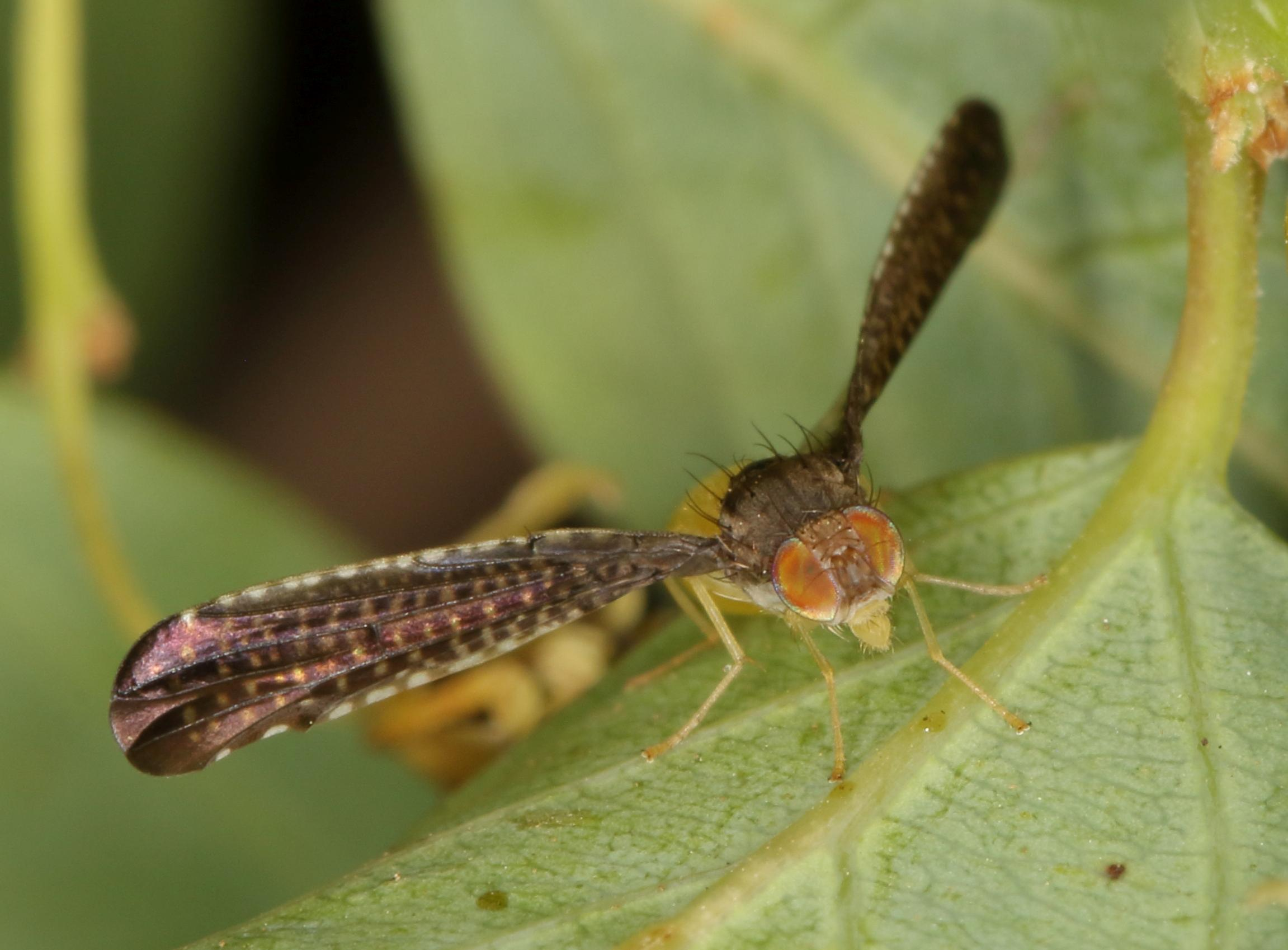
- Elaphromyia adatha

Scientific classification
- Kingdom: Animalia
- Phylum: Arthropoda
- Class: Insecta
- Order: Diptera
- Family: Tephritidae
- Subfamily: Tephritinae
- Tribe: Tephrellini
- Genus: Elaphromyia; Bigot, 1859

Type species
- Elaphromyia melas Bigot, 1859

Synonyms
- Paralleloptera Bezzi, 1913

= Elaphromyia =

Genus of flies

Elaphromyia is a genus of tephritid or fruit flies in the family Tephritidae.

== Species ==
- Elaphromyia adatha (Walker, 1849)
- Elaphromyia fissa Munro, 1957
- Elaphromyia hardyi Wang, 1996
- Elaphromyia incompleta Shiraki, 1933
- Elaphromyia magna Hardy, 1988
- Elaphromyia multisetosa Shiraki, 1933
- Elaphromyia pallida Bezzi, 1926
- Elaphromyia pterocallaeformis (Bezzi, 1913)
- Elaphromyia siva Frey, 1917
- Elaphromyia transversa Hardy, 1988
- Elaphromyia yunnanensis Wang, 1990
