= Triandomelaena =

Scientific classification
- Kingdom: Animalia
- Phylum: Arthropoda
- Class: Insecta
- Order: Diptera
- Family: Tephritidae
- Subfamily: Tephritinae
- Tribe: Tephrellini
- Genus: Triandomelaena; Hancock, 1986

Type species
- Triandomelaena brevicostalis Hancock, 1986

Genus of flies

Triandomelaena is a genus of tephritid or fruit flies in the family Tephritidae.

== Species ==
- Triandomelaena albinus (Bezzi, 1924)
- Triandomelaena brevicostalis Hancock, 1986
