= Afraciura zernyi =

Scientific classification
- Kingdom: Animalia
- Phylum: Arthropoda
- Class: Insecta
- Order: Diptera
- Family: Tephritidae
- Subfamily: Tephritinae
- Tribe: Tephrellini
- Genus: Afraciura
- Species: A. zernyi

Binomial name
- Afraciura zernyi Hering, 1941

Synonyms
- Conionota fracta Munro, 1947

Species of fly

Afraciura zernyi is a species of tephritid or fruit flies in the genus Afraciura of the family Tephritidae.

== Distribution ==
Tanzania, Kenya.
