= Afraciura =

Scientific classification
- Kingdom: Animalia
- Phylum: Arthropoda
- Class: Insecta
- Order: Diptera
- Family: Tephritidae
- Subfamily: Tephritinae
- Tribe: Tephrellini
- Genus: Afraciura; Hering, 1941

Type species
- Afraciura zernyi Hering, 1941

Synonyms
- Conionota Munro, 1947

Genus of flies

Afraciura is a genus of tephritid or fruit flies in the family Tephritidae.

== Species ==
- Afraciura reculta (Munro, 1947)
- Afraciura quaternaria (Bezzi, 1924)
- Afraciura quinaria (Bezzi, 1924)
- Afraciura zernyi Hering, 1941
