= Gymnaciura =

Scientific classification
- Kingdom: Animalia
- Phylum: Arthropoda
- Class: Insecta
- Order: Diptera
- Family: Tephritidae
- Subfamily: Tephritinae
- Tribe: Tephrellini
- Genus: Gymnaciura; Hering, 1942

Type species
- Aciura distigmoides Hering, 1941

Synonyms
- Tanaosema Munro, 1947

Genus of flies

Gymnaciura is a genus of tephritid or fruit flies in the family Tephritidae.

== Species ==
- Gymnaciura austeni (Munro, 1935)
- Gymnaciura neavei (Bezzi, 1920)
