= Tephrella =

Scientific classification
- Kingdom: Animalia
- Phylum: Arthropoda
- Clade: Pancrustacea
- Class: Insecta
- Order: Diptera
- Family: Tephritidae
- Subfamily: Tephritinae
- Tribe: Tephrellini
- Genus: Tephrella; Bezzi, 1913

Type species
- Tephrella decipiens Bezzi, 1913

Genus of flies

Tephrella is a genus of tephritid or fruit flies in the family Tephritidae.

== Species ==
- Tephrella decipiens Bezzi, 1913
