= Tephraciura =

Scientific classification
- Kingdom: Animalia
- Phylum: Arthropoda
- Class: Insecta
- Order: Diptera
- Family: Tephritidae
- Subfamily: Tephritinae
- Tribe: Tephrellini
- Genus: Tephraciura; Hering, 1941

Type species
- Trypeta oborinia Walker, 1849

Synonyms
- Jacotella Munro, 1947

Genus of flies

Tephraciura is a genus of tephritid or fruit flies in the family Tephritidae.

== Species ==
- Tephraciura angusta (Loew, 1861)
- Tephraciura basimacula (Bezzi, 1924)
- Tephraciura flavimacula Hancock, 1991
- Tephraciura latecuneata (Munro, 1947)
- Tephraciura oborinia (Walker, 1849)
- Tephraciura pachmarica Agarwal & Kapoor, 1988
- Tephraciura phantasma (Hering, 1935)
- Tephraciura semiangusta (Bezzi, 1918)
- Tephraciura sphenoptera (Bezzi, 1924)
- Tephraciura tulearensis Hancock, 1991
