= Stephanotrypeta =

Scientific classification
- Kingdom: Animalia
- Phylum: Arthropoda
- Class: Insecta
- Order: Diptera
- Family: Tephritidae
- Subfamily: Tephritinae
- Tribe: Tephrellini
- Genus: Stephanotrypeta; Hendel, 1931

Type species
- Stephanotrypeta brevicosta Hendel, 1931

Synonyms
- Terpnodesma Munro, 1956

Genus of flies

Stephanotrypeta is a genus of tephritid or fruit flies in the family Tephritidae.

== Species ==
- Stephanotrypeta brevicosta Hendel, 1931
- Stephanotrypeta nigrofemorata (Munro, 1929)
- Stephanotrypeta taeniaptera (Bezzi, 1923)
- Stephanotrypeta vittata Freidberg, 1979
