= Malaisinia =

Scientific classification
- Kingdom: Animalia
- Phylum: Arthropoda
- Class: Insecta
- Order: Diptera
- Family: Tephritidae
- Subfamily: Tephritinae
- Tribe: Tephrellini
- Genus: Malaisinia; Hering, 1938

Type species
- Malaisinia pulcherrima Hering, 1938

Genus of flies

Malaisinia is a genus of tephritid or fruit flies in the family Tephritidae.

== Species ==
- Malaisinia pulcherrima Hering, 1938
