= Paraciura =

Scientific classification
- Kingdom: Animalia
- Phylum: Arthropoda
- Class: Insecta
- Order: Diptera
- Family: Tephritidae
- Subfamily: Tephritinae
- Tribe: Tephrellini
- Genus: Paraciura; Hering, 1942

Type species
- Aciura perpicillaris Bezzi, 1920

Synonyms
- Biretmus Munro, 1947

Genus of flies

Paraciura is a genus of tephritid or fruit flies in the family Tephritidae.

== Species ==
- Paraciura perpicillaris (Bezzi, 1920)
