= Tephrelalis =

Scientific classification
- Kingdom: Animalia
- Phylum: Arthropoda
- Class: Insecta
- Order: Diptera
- Family: Tephritidae
- Subfamily: Tephritinae
- Tribe: Tephrellini
- Genus: Tephrelalis; Korneyev, 1993

Type species
- Tephrelalis sexincisa Korneyev, 1993

Genus of flies

Tephrelalis is a genus of tephritid or fruit flies in the family Tephritidae.

== Species ==
- Tephrelalis sexincisa Korneyev, 1993
