= Cesaspheniscus =

Scientific classification
- Kingdom: Animalia
- Phylum: Arthropoda
- Class: Insecta
- Order: Diptera
- Family: Tephritidae
- Subfamily: Tephritinae
- Tribe: Tephrellini
- Genus: Cesaspheniscus; Koçak & Kemal, 2009

Type species
- Spheniscomyia debskii Efflatoun, 1924

Synonyms
- Paraspheniscus Hendel, 1927

Genus of flies

Cesaspheniscus is a genus of tephritid or fruit flies in the family Tephritidae.

== Species ==
- Cesaspheniscus debskii (Efflatoun, 1924)
