= Namibiocesa =

Scientific classification
- Kingdom: Animalia
- Phylum: Arthropoda
- Class: Insecta
- Order: Diptera
- Family: Tephritidae
- Subfamily: Tephritinae
- Tribe: Tephrellini
- Genus: Namibiocesa; Koçak, 2009

Type species
- Leucothrix barbata Munro, 1929

Synonyms
- Leucothrix Munro, 1929

Genus of flies

Namibiocesa is a genus of tephritid or fruit flies in the family Tephritidae.

== Species ==
- Namibiocesa barbata (Munro, 1929)
- Namibiocesa incana (Munro, 1963)
- Namibiocesa oryx (Munro, 1956)
