= Brachyaciura =

Scientific classification
- Kingdom: Animalia
- Phylum: Arthropoda
- Clade: Pancrustacea
- Class: Insecta
- Order: Diptera
- Family: Tephritidae
- Subfamily: Tephritinae
- Tribe: Tephrellini
- Genus: Brachyaciura; Bezzi, 1924

Type species
- Brachyaciura kovacsi Bezzi, 1924

Genus of flies

Brachyaciura is a genus of tephritid or fruit flies in the family Tephritidae.

== Species ==
- Brachyaciura kovacsi Bezzi, 1924
- Brachyaciura rufiventris (Bezzi, 1918)
- Brachyaciura limbata (Bezzi, 1924)
