= Malagaciura =

Scientific classification
- Kingdom: Animalia
- Phylum: Arthropoda
- Class: Insecta
- Order: Diptera
- Family: Tephritidae
- Subfamily: Tephritinae
- Tribe: Tephrellini
- Genus: Malagaciura; Hancock, 1991

Type species
- Malagaciura stuckenbergi Hancock, 1991

Genus of flies

Malagaciura is a genus of tephritid or fruit flies in the family Tephritidae.

== Species ==
- Malagaciura stuckenbergi Hancock, 1991
