= Pliomelaena =

Scientific classification
- Kingdom: Animalia
- Phylum: Arthropoda
- Clade: Pancrustacea
- Class: Insecta
- Order: Diptera
- Family: Tephritidae
- Subfamily: Tephritinae
- Tribe: Tephrellini
- Genus: Pliomelaena; Bezzi, 1918

Type species
- Euaresta brevifrons Bezzi, 1918

Synonyms
- Oliomelaena Bezzi, 1924; Protephritis Shiraki, 1933; Indaresta Hering, 1941

Genus of flies

Pliomelaena is a genus of tephritid or fruit flies in the family Tephritidae.

== Species ==
- Pliomelaena assimilis (Shiraki, 1968)
- Pliomelaena biseta Wang, 1996
- Pliomelaena brevifrons (Bezzi, 1918)
- Pliomelaena caeca Bezzi, 1924
- Pliomelaena callista (Hering, 1941)
- Pliomelaena discosa Munro, 1947
- Pliomelaena exilis Munro, 1947
- Pliomelaena joanetta Munro, 1947
- Pliomelaena luzonica Hardy, 1974
- Pliomelaena parviguttata Hering, 1952
- Pliomelaena quadrimaculata Agarwal & Kapoor, 1989
- Pliomelaena sauteri (Enderlein, 1911)
- Pliomelaena shirozui Ito, 1984
- Pliomelaena sonani (Shiraki, 1933)
- Pliomelaena spathuliniforma (Dirlbek & Dirlbek, 1968) [= *Pliomelaena udhampurensis Agarwal & Kapoor, 1988 per Hancock, 1997]
- Pliomelaena stevensoni Munro, 1937
- Pliomelaena translucida Hering, 1942
- Pliomelaena zonogastra (Bezzi, 1913)
