= Pseudafreutreta =

Scientific classification
- Kingdom: Animalia
- Phylum: Arthropoda
- Class: Insecta
- Order: Diptera
- Family: Tephritidae
- Subfamily: Tephritinae
- Tribe: Tephrellini
- Genus: Pseudafreutreta; Hering, 1942

Type species
- Pseudafreutreta fatua Hering, 1942

Genus of flies

Pseudafreutreta is a genus of tephritid or fruit flies in the family Tephritidae.

== Species ==
- Pseudafreutreta bicolor Munro, 1957
- Pseudafreutreta biseriata (Bezzi, 1924)
- Pseudafreutreta fatua Hering, 1942
