= Curticella =

Scientific classification
- Kingdom: Animalia
- Phylum: Arthropoda
- Class: Insecta
- Order: Diptera
- Family: Tephritidae
- Subfamily: Tephritinae
- Tribe: Tephrellini
- Genus: Curticella; Hardy, 1959

Type species
- Trypeta approximans Walker, 1860

Genus of flies

Curticella is a genus of tephritid or fruit flies in the family Tephritidae.

== Species ==
- Curticella approximans (Walker, 1860)
