= Ghentia =

Scientific classification
- Kingdom: Animalia
- Phylum: Arthropoda
- Class: Insecta
- Order: Diptera
- Family: Tephritidae
- Subfamily: Tephritinae
- Tribe: Tephrellini
- Genus: Ghentia; Munro, 1947

Type species
- Afreutreta limbatella Bezzi, 1926

Genus of flies

Ghentia is a genus of tephritid or fruit flies in the family Tephritidae.

== Species ==
- Ghentia millepunctatum Bezzi, 1918
