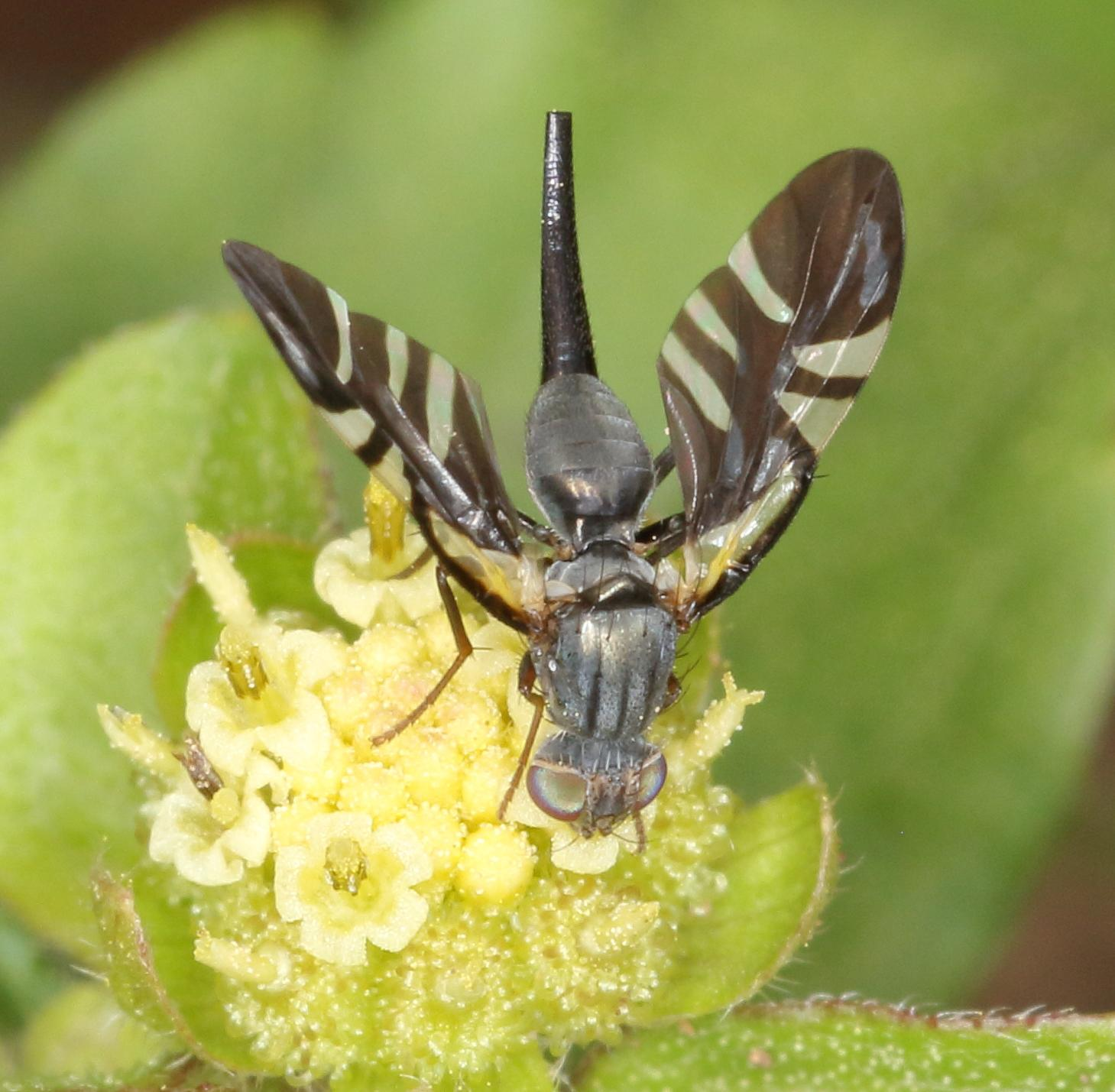

Scientific classification
- Kingdom: Animalia
- Phylum: Arthropoda
- Class: Insecta
- Order: Diptera
- Family: Tephritidae
- Subfamily: Tephritinae
- Tribe: Tephrellini
- Genus: Metasphenisca
- Species: M. tetrachaeta

Binomial name
- Metasphenisca tetrachaeta (Bezzi, 1918)

Synonyms
- Aciura tetrachaeta Bezzi, 1924

= Metasphenisca tetrachaeta =

Species of fly

Metasphenisca tetrachaeta is a species of tephritids or fruit flies in the genus Metasphenisca of the family Tephritidae.

== Distribution ==
Zambia, Zimbabwe, Congo, South Africa.
