= Sundaresta =

Scientific classification
- Kingdom: Animalia
- Phylum: Arthropoda
- Class: Insecta
- Order: Diptera
- Family: Tephritidae
- Subfamily: Tephritinae
- Tribe: Tephrellini
- Genus: Sundaresta; Hering, 1953

Type species
- Sundaresta hilaris Hering, 1953

Genus of flies

Sundaresta is a genus of tephritid or fruit flies in the family Tephritidae.

== Species ==
- Sundaresta hilaris Hering, 1953
