= Ypsilomena =

Scientific classification
- Kingdom: Animalia
- Phylum: Arthropoda
- Class: Insecta
- Order: Diptera
- Family: Tephritidae
- Subfamily: Tephritinae
- Tribe: Tephrellini
- Genus: Ypsilomena; Munro, 1947

Type species
- Spheniscomyia compacta Bezzi, 1924

Genus of flies

Ypsilomena is a genus of tephritid or fruit flies in the family Tephritidae.

== Species ==
- Ypsilomena compacta (Bezzi, 1924)
