= Paraspheniscoides =

Scientific classification
- Kingdom: Animalia
- Phylum: Arthropoda
- Class: Insecta
- Order: Diptera
- Family: Tephritidae
- Subfamily: Tephritinae
- Tribe: Tephrellini
- Genus: Paraspheniscoides; Hering, 1941

Type species
- Trypeta binaria Loew, 1861

Synonyms
- Notoxesis Munro, 1947

Genus of flies

Paraspheniscoides is a genus of tephritid or fruit flies in the family Tephritidae.

== Species ==
- Paraspheniscoides binarius (Loew, 1861)
- Paraspheniscoides senarius (Bezzi, 1924)
