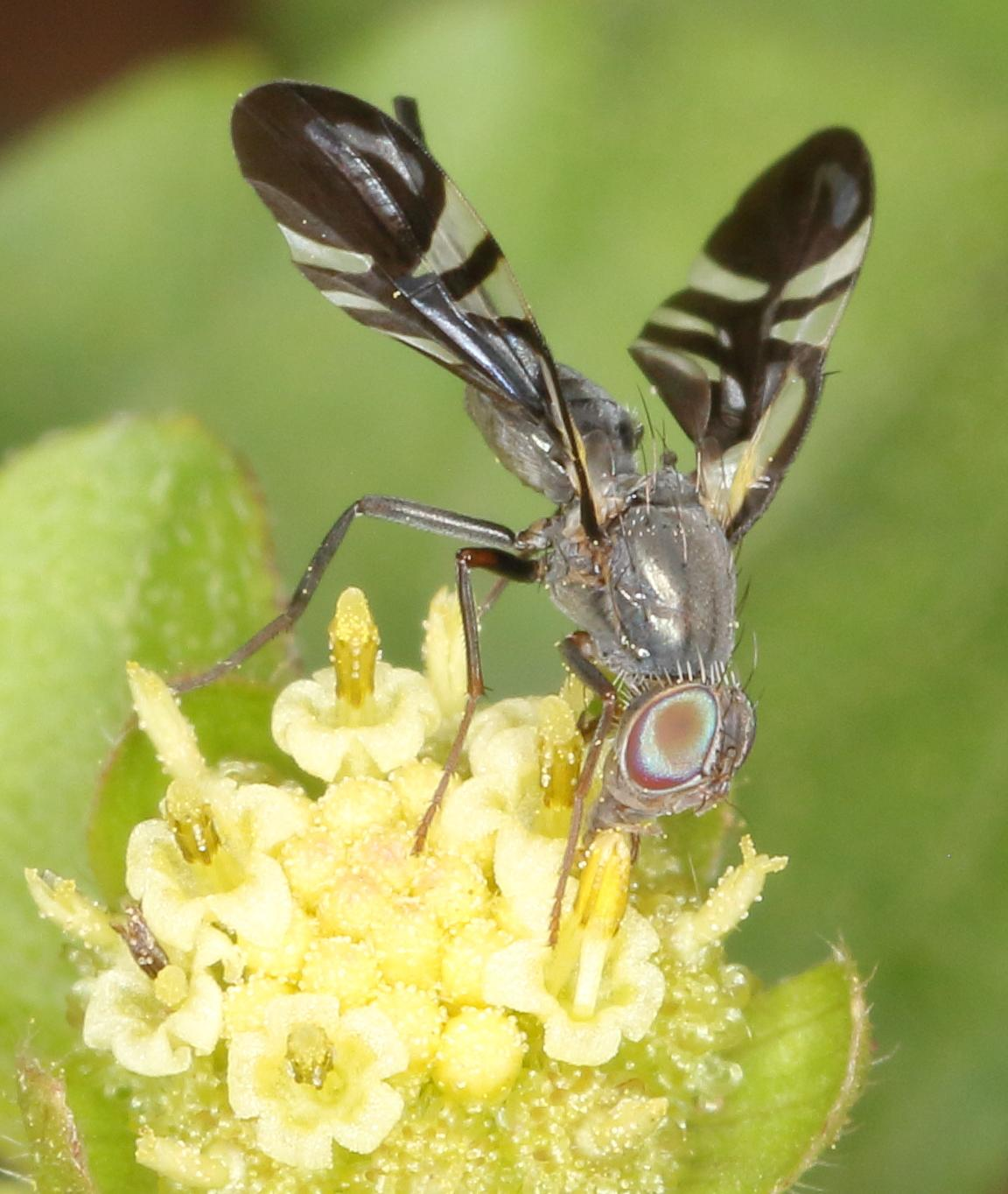
- Metasphenisca tetrachaeta

Scientific classification
- Kingdom: Animalia
- Phylum: Arthropoda
- Class: Insecta
- Order: Diptera
- Family: Tephritidae
- Subfamily: Tephritinae
- Tribe: Tephrellini; Hendel, 1927

Synonyms
- Platensinini Munro, 1937; Tephrelliini Hennig, 1952

= Tephrellini =

Tribe of flies

Tephrellini is a tribe of tephritid or fruit flies in the family Tephritidae.

== Genera ==
- Aciura Robineau-Desvoidy, 1830
- Afraciura Hering, 1941
- Bezzina Munro, 1957
- Brachyaciura Bezzi, 1924
- Cesaspheniscus Hendel, 1927
- Chipingomyia Hancock, 1986
- Curticella Hardy, 1959
- Dicheniotes Munro, 1938
- Dorycricus Munro, 1947
- Elaphromyia Bigot, 1859
- Ghentia Munro, 1947
- Gymnaciura Hering, 1942
- Katonaia Munro, 1925
- Malagaciura Hancock, 1991
- Malaisinia Hering, 1938
- Manicomyia Hancock, 1986
- Metasphenisca Hendel, 1914
- Munroella Bezzi, 1924
- Namibiocesa Koçak, 2009
- Ocnerioxyna Séguy, 1939
- Oxyaciura Hendel, 1927
- Paraciura Hering, 1942
- Paraspheniscoides Hering, 1941
- Pediapelta Munro, 1947
- Perirhithrum Bezzi, 1920
- Platensina Enderlein, 1911
- Platomma Bezzi, 1924
- Pliomelaena Bezzi, 1918
- Psednometopum Munro, 1937
- Pseudafreutreta Hering, 1942
- Pterope Munro, 1957
- Stephanotrypeta Hendel, 1931
- Sundaresta Hering, 1953
- Tephraciura Hering, 1941
- Tephrelalis Korneyev, 1993
- Tephrella Bezzi, 1913
- Triandomelaena Hancock, 1986
- Ypsilomena Munro, 1947
