= Spathulina peringueyi =

Scientific classification
- Kingdom: Animalia
- Phylum: Arthropoda
- Class: Insecta
- Order: Diptera
- Family: Tephritidae
- Subfamily: Tephritinae
- Tribe: Tephritini
- Genus: Spathulina
- Species: S. peringueyi

Binomial name
- Spathulina peringueyi Bezzi, 1924

Synonyms
- Spathulina peringueyi var. triplex Munro, 1938

Species of fly

Spathulina peringueyi is a species of tephritid or fruit flies in the genus Spathulina of the family Tephritidae.

== Distribution ==
South Africa.
