= Spathulina biseuarestina =

Scientific classification
- Kingdom: Animalia
- Phylum: Arthropoda
- Class: Insecta
- Order: Diptera
- Family: Tephritidae
- Subfamily: Tephritinae
- Tribe: Tephritini
- Genus: Spathulina
- Species: S. biseuarestina

Binomial name
- Spathulina biseuarestina Bezzi, 1924

Species of fly

Spathulina biseuarestina is a species of tephritid or fruit flies in the genus Spathulina of the family Tephritidae.

== Distribution ==
South Africa.
