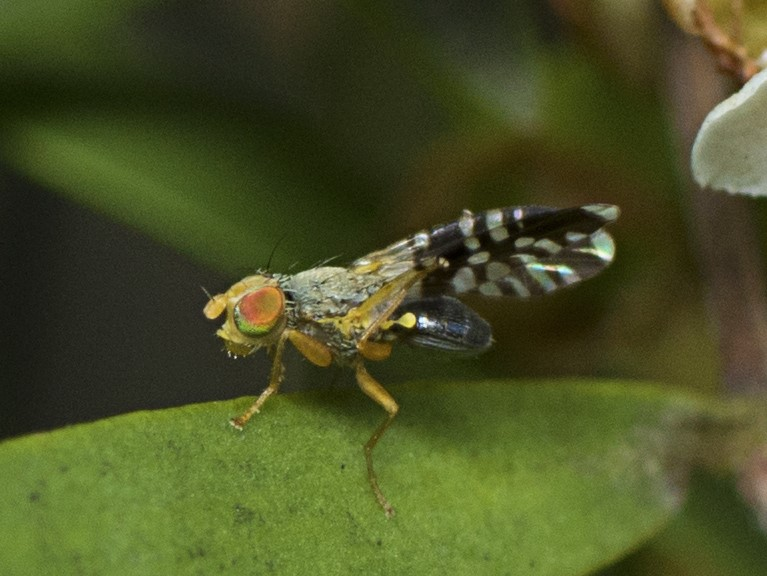

Scientific classification
- Kingdom: Animalia
- Phylum: Arthropoda
- Class: Insecta
- Order: Diptera
- Family: Tephritidae
- Subfamily: Tephritinae
- Tribe: Tephritini
- Genus: Spathulina
- Species: S. acroleuca

Binomial name
- Spathulina acroleuca (Schiner, 1868)

Synonyms
- Tephritis acroleuca Schiner, 1868; Trypeta undecimguttata Thomson, 1869; Oxyna nigrifemorata Meijere, 1914; Oxyna parca Bezzi, 1913; Oxyna parceguttata Becker, 1903

= Spathulina acroleuca =

Species of fly

Spathulina acroleuca is a species of tephritid or fruit flies in the family Tephritidae.

== Distribution ==
Egypt, widespread Afrotropical, Oriental, and Australasian Regions.
