= Spathulina arcucincta =

Scientific classification
- Kingdom: Animalia
- Phylum: Arthropoda
- Class: Insecta
- Order: Diptera
- Family: Tephritidae
- Subfamily: Tephritinae
- Tribe: Tephritini
- Genus: Spathulina
- Species: S. arcucincta

Binomial name
- Spathulina arcucincta Bezzi, 1924

Synonyms
- Spathulina arcucincta var. arida Munro, 1938

Species of fly

Spathulina arcucincta is a species of tephritid or fruit flies in the genus Spathulina of the family Tephritidae.

== Distribution ==
Namibia, South Africa, Lesotho.
