= Spathulina hessii =

Scientific classification
- Kingdom: Animalia
- Phylum: Arthropoda
- Class: Insecta
- Order: Diptera
- Family: Tephritidae
- Subfamily: Tephritinae
- Tribe: Tephritini
- Genus: Spathulina
- Species: S. hessii

Binomial name
- Spathulina hessii (Wiedemann, 1818)

Synonyms
- Tephritis hessii Wiedemann, 1818

Species of fly

Spathulina hessii is a species of tephritid or fruit flies in the genus Spathulina of the family Tephritidae.

== Distribution ==
This species can mostly be found around South Africa.
