= Spathulina sicula =

Scientific classification
- Kingdom: Animalia
- Phylum: Arthropoda
- Class: Insecta
- Order: Diptera
- Family: Tephritidae
- Subfamily: Tephritinae
- Tribe: Tephritini
- Genus: Spathulina
- Species: S. sicula

Binomial name
- Spathulina sicula Rondani, 1856

Synonyms
- Tephritis tristis Loew, 1869; Urellia sepia Becker, 1908; Trypeta luisieri Tavares, 1901

Species of fly

Spathulina sicula is a species of tephritid or fruit flies in the genus Spathulina of the family Tephritidae.

== Distribution ==
Spain, Portugal, Italy, Israel, Canary Islands.
