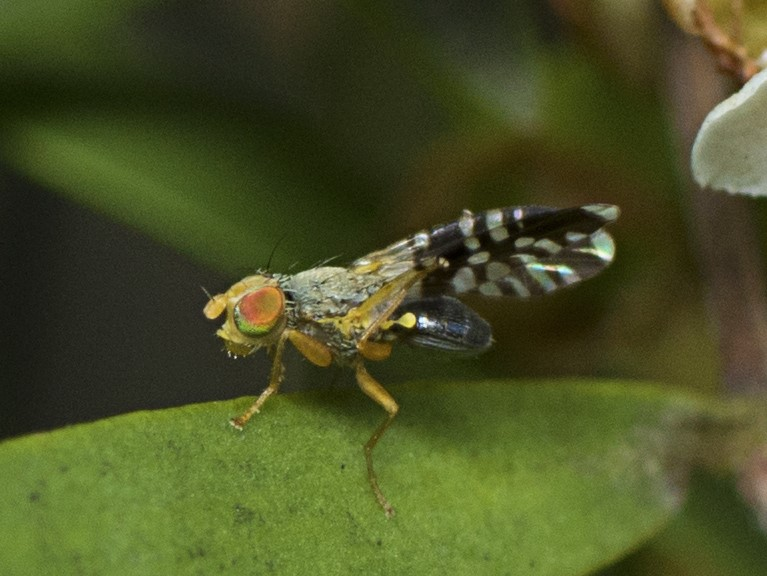
- Spathulina acroleuca

Scientific classification
- Kingdom: Animalia
- Phylum: Arthropoda
- Class: Insecta
- Order: Diptera
- Family: Tephritidae
- Subfamily: Tephritinae
- Tribe: Tephritini
- Genus: Spathulina; Rondani, 1856

Type species
- Spathulina sicula Rondani, 1856

= Spathulina =

Genus of flies

Spathulina is a genus of tephritid or fruit flies in the family Tephritidae.

== Species ==
- Spathulina abyssinica Bezzi, 1924
- Spathulina acroleuca (Schiner, 1868)
- Spathulina arcucincta Bezzi, 1924
- Spathulina biseuarestina Bezzi, 1924
- Spathulina euryomma Bezzi, 1924
- Spathulina hessii (Wiedemann, 1818)
- Spathulina peringueyi Bezzi, 1924
- Spathulina sicula Rondani, 1856
