= Prosheliomyia =

Scientific classification
- Kingdom: Animalia
- Phylum: Arthropoda
- Clade: Pancrustacea
- Class: Insecta
- Order: Diptera
- Family: Tachinidae
- Subfamily: Dexiinae
- Tribe: Voriini
- Genus: Prosheliomyia; Brauer & von Bergenstamm, 1891

Type species
- Prosheliomyia nietneri Brauer & von Bergenstamm, 1891

Synonyms
- Halidayopsis Townsend, 1927; Medinacemyia Townsend, 1928

Genus of flies

Prosheliomyia is a genus of bristle flies in the family Tachinidae.

== Subgenera and species ==
Subgenus Prosheliomyia Brauer & von Bergenstamm, 1891

- Prosheliomyia brevinervis (Malloch, 1935)
- Prosheliomyia formosensis (Townsend, 1927)
- Prosheliomyia nietneri Brauer & von Bergenstamm, 1891
- Prosheliomyia sibuyana (Townsend, 1928)

Subgenus Thrixionellus Mesnil, 1968

- Prosheliomyia mirabilis Mesnil, 1968
- Prosheliomyia nigricornis Mesnil, 1968
- Prosheliomyia pallida Mesnil, 1968
