= Prosheliomyia (Thrixionellus) =

Scientific classification
- Kingdom: Animalia
- Phylum: Arthropoda
- Clade: Pancrustacea
- Class: Insecta
- Order: Diptera
- Family: Tachinidae
- Genus: Prosheliomyia
- Subgenus: Thrixionellus; Mesnil, 1968

Type species
- Prosheliomyia (Thrixionellus) mirabilis Mesnil, 1968

Subgenus of flies

Thrixionellus is a subgenus of bristle flies in the family Tachinidae endemic to Madagascar.

== Species ==
- Prosheliomyia mirabilis Mesnil, 1968
- Prosheliomyia nigricornis Mesnil, 1968
- Prosheliomyia pallida Mesnil, 1968
