= Prosheliomyia (Prosheliomyia) =

Scientific classification
- Kingdom: Animalia
- Phylum: Arthropoda
- Clade: Pancrustacea
- Class: Insecta
- Order: Diptera
- Family: Tachinidae
- Genus: Prosheliomyia
- Subgenus: Prosheliomyia; Brauer & von Bergenstamm, 1891

Type species
- Prosheliomyia nietneri Brauer & von Bergenstamm, 1891

Synonyms
- Halidayopsis Townsend, 1927; Medinacemyia Townsend, 1928

Subgenus of flies

Prosheliomyia is a subgenus of bristle flies in the family Tachinidae.

== Species ==
- Prosheliomyia brevinervis (Malloch, 1935)
- Prosheliomyia formosensis (Townsend, 1927)
- Prosheliomyia nietneri Brauer & von Bergenstamm, 1891
- Prosheliomyia sibuyana (Townsend, 1928)
