= Prosheliomyia nietneri =

Scientific classification
- Kingdom: Animalia
- Phylum: Arthropoda
- Clade: Pancrustacea
- Class: Insecta
- Order: Diptera
- Family: Tachinidae
- Genus: Prosheliomyia
- Subgenus: Prosheliomyia
- Species: P. nietneri

Binomial name
- Prosheliomyia nietneri Brauer & von Berganstamm, 1891

Species of fly

Prosheliomyia nietneri is a species of fly in the family Tachinidae.

== Distribution ==
Sri Lanka.
