= Prosheliomyia formosensis =

Scientific classification
- Kingdom: Animalia
- Phylum: Arthropoda
- Clade: Pancrustacea
- Class: Insecta
- Order: Diptera
- Family: Tachinidae
- Genus: Prosheliomyia
- Subgenus: Prosheliomyia
- Species: P. formosensis

Binomial name
- Prosheliomyia formosensis (Townsend, 1927)

Synonyms
- Halidayopsis formosensis Townsend, 1927

Species of fly

Prosheliomyia formosensis is a species of fly in the family Tachinidae.

== Distribution ==
P. formosensis is found in Taiwan.
