= Prosheliomyia sibuyana =

Scientific classification
- Kingdom: Animalia
- Phylum: Arthropoda
- Clade: Pancrustacea
- Class: Insecta
- Order: Diptera
- Family: Tachinidae
- Genus: Prosheliomyia
- Subgenus: Prosheliomyia
- Species: P. sibuyana

Binomial name
- Prosheliomyia sibuyana (Townsend, 1928)

Synonyms
- Medinacemyia sibuyana Townsend, 1928

Species of fly

Prosheliomyia sibuyana is a species of fly in the family Tachinidae.

== Distribution ==
Philippines.
