= Prosheliomyia nigricornis =

Scientific classification
- Kingdom: Animalia
- Phylum: Arthropoda
- Clade: Pancrustacea
- Class: Insecta
- Order: Diptera
- Family: Tachinidae
- Genus: Prosheliomyia
- Subgenus: Thrixionellus
- Species: P. nigricornis

Binomial name
- Prosheliomyia nigricornis Mesnil, 1968

Species of fly

Prosheliomyia nigricornis is a species of fly in the family Tachinidae.

== Distribution ==
Madagascar.
