= Prosheliomyia mirabilis =

Scientific classification
- Missing taxonomy template (fix): Prosheliomyia (Thrixionellus)
- Species: P. mirabilis

Binomial name
- Prosheliomyia mirabilis Mesnil, 1968

Species of fly

Prosheliomyia mirabilis is a species of fly in the family Tachinidae.

== Distribution ==
Madagascar.
