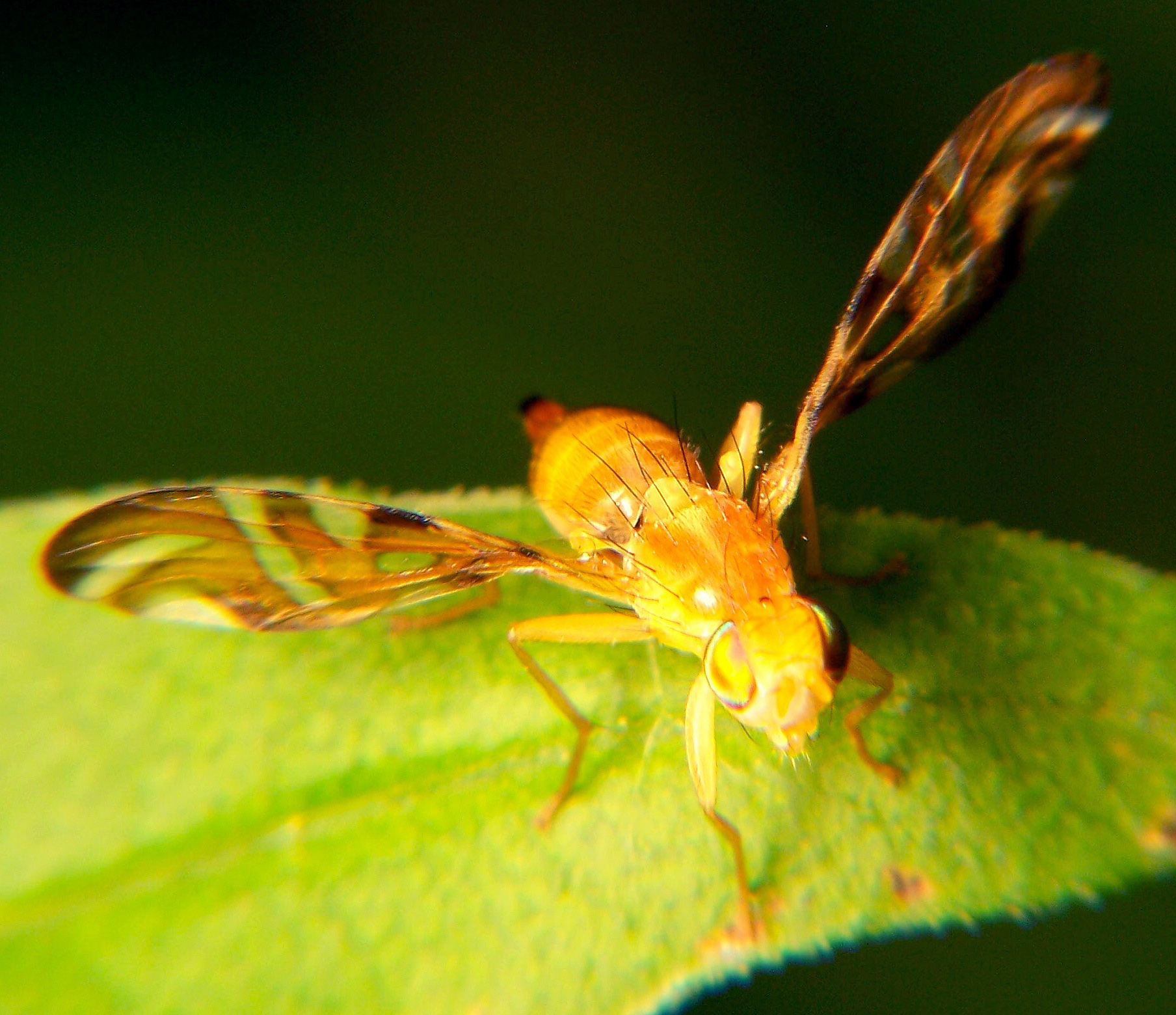
- Sunflower maggot fly, Strauzia longipennis

Scientific classification
- Kingdom: Animalia
- Phylum: Arthropoda
- Class: Insecta
- Order: Diptera
- Family: Tephritidae
- Subfamily: Trypetinae

Tribes
- See text

Diversity
- 118 genera, about 1,000 species

= Trypetinae =

Subfamily of flies

The Trypetinae are a subfamily of tephritid fruit flies.

== Systematics ==
The Trypetinae are grouped into seven tribes:

- Adramini: 183 species, 26 genera:

Acinoeuphranta, Adrama, Adramoides, Brandtomyia, Celidodacus, Coelopacidia, Coelotrypes, Conradtina, Crinitisophira, Cyclopsia, Dimeringophrys, Euphranta, (subgenus Euphranta, Rhacochlaena and Xanthotrypeta), Hardyadrama, Ichneumonosoma, Indophranta, Meracanthomyia, Munromyia, Nitobeia, Paraeuphranta, Pelmatops, Piestometopon, Pseudopelmatops, Scolocolus, Soita, Trypanophion and Xaniosternum.

- Carpomyini: 123 species, 12 genera:

Carpomya, Cryptodacus, Haywardina, Malica, Notomma, Oedicarena, Paraterellia, Rhagoletis, Rhagoletotrypeta, Scleropithus, Stoneola and Zonosemata.

- Rivelliomimini: 6 species, 3 genera:

Ornithoschema (syn: Cycasia), Rivelliomima and Xanthanomoea.

- Trypetini: 416 species, 50 genera:

Acidia, Acidiella (possible syn: Machaomyia), Acidiostigma, Acidoxantha, Acidoxanthopsis, Aciuropsis, Aischrocrania, Alsangelisca, Anastrephoides, Angelogelasinus, Anomoia, Apiculonia, Calosphenisca, Carpophthoracidia, Cervarita, Chenacidiella, Chetostoma, Cornutrypeta, Craspedoxanthitea, Cristobalia, Drosanthus, Dryadodacryma, Euleia, Hemilea, Hemileoides, Hemileophila, Hemiristina, Hoplandromyia, Itosigo, Kerzhnerella, Magnimyiolia, Montiludia, Morinowotome, Myoleja, Nemeurinus, Nitrariomyia, Oreurinus, Paracanthonevra, Paramyiolia, Parastenopa, Paratrypeta, Pardalaspinus, Philophylla, Prospheniscus, Pseudhemilea, Sinacidia, Stemonocera, Strauzia, Trypeta and Vidalia.

- Toxotrypanini: 235 species, 3 genera:

Anastrepha, Hexachaeta and Toxotrypana.

- Xarnutini: 8 species, 2 genera:

Platystomopsis and Xarnuta.

- Zaceratini: 2 species, 2 genera:

Plioreocepta and Zacerata.

39 species in 21 genera are not included in any of the above tribes. The incertae sedis genera are:

Alincocallistomyia, Breviculala, Callistomyia, Cephalophysa, Epinettyra, Esacidia, Lalokia, Malaisella, Molynocoelia, Monacidia, Notommoides, Ochrobapha, Paracristobalia, Platyparea, Poecilothea, Pseudomyoleja, Pseudophorellia, Pycnella, Sosiopsila, Taomyia and Tarphobregma.

Other genera include:

Cryptoplagia (syn: Haywardina)
