= Phantasmiella =

Scientific classification
- Kingdom: Animalia
- Phylum: Arthropoda
- Class: Insecta
- Order: Diptera
- Family: Tephritidae
- Subfamily: Trypetinae
- Genus: Phantasmiella

Genus of flies

Phantasmiella is a genus of fruit flies in the family Tephritidae. It is considered a synonym of Soita.
