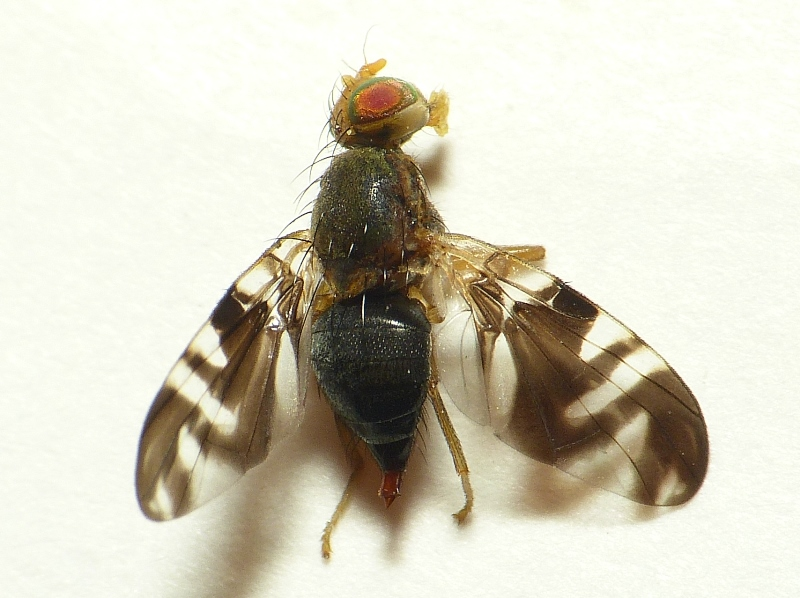
- Philophylla caesio Netherlands

Scientific classification
- Kingdom: Animalia
- Phylum: Arthropoda
- Class: Insecta
- Order: Diptera
- Family: Tephritidae
- Genus: Philophylla
- Species: P. caesio

Binomial name
- Philophylla caesio (Harris, 1780)

= Philophylla caesio =

Species of fly

Philophylla caesio is a species of fly in the family Tephritidae, the gall flies. It is found in the Palearctic. The larvae mine the leaves of Urtica.
