= Acidiella =

Acidiella may refer to:

- Acidiella (fly), a tephritid or fruit fly genus in the family Tephritidae
- Acidiella (fungus), a fungus genus in the family Teratosphaeriaceae
