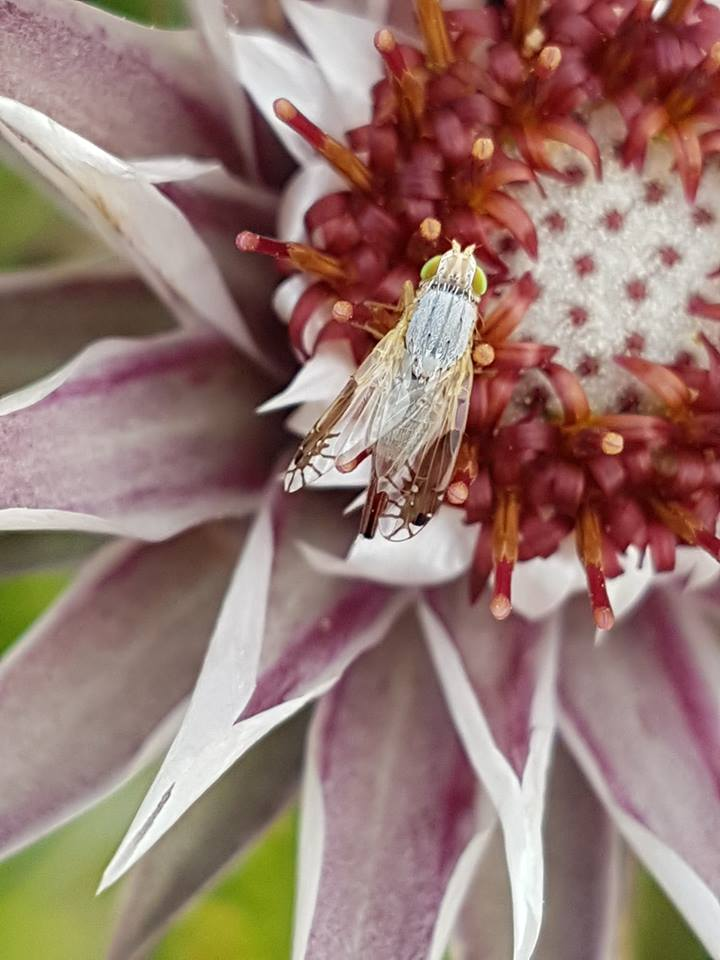
- Trupanea sp. (Tephritidae), a representative member of the family Tephritidae from South Africa, the same family as Coelotrypes fasciolata

Scientific classification
- Kingdom: Animalia
- Phylum: Arthropoda
- Clade: Pancrustacea
- Class: Insecta
- Order: Diptera
- Family: Tephritidae
- Genus: Coelotrypes
- Species: C. fasciolata

Binomial name
- Coelotrypes fasciolata (Loew, 1863)

Synonyms
- Trypeta fasciolata Loew, 1863 Coelotrypes fasciolatus (Loew, 1863)

= Coelotrypes fasciolata =

Species of fruit fly in the family Tephritidae

Coelotrypes fasciolata is a species of tephritid fly (commonly known as fruit flies) belonging to the genus Coelotrypes in the subfamily Trypetinae of the family Tephritidae. It was first formally described by the German entomologist Hermann Loew in 1863. The species is distributed across sub-Saharan Africa.

== Taxonomy ==
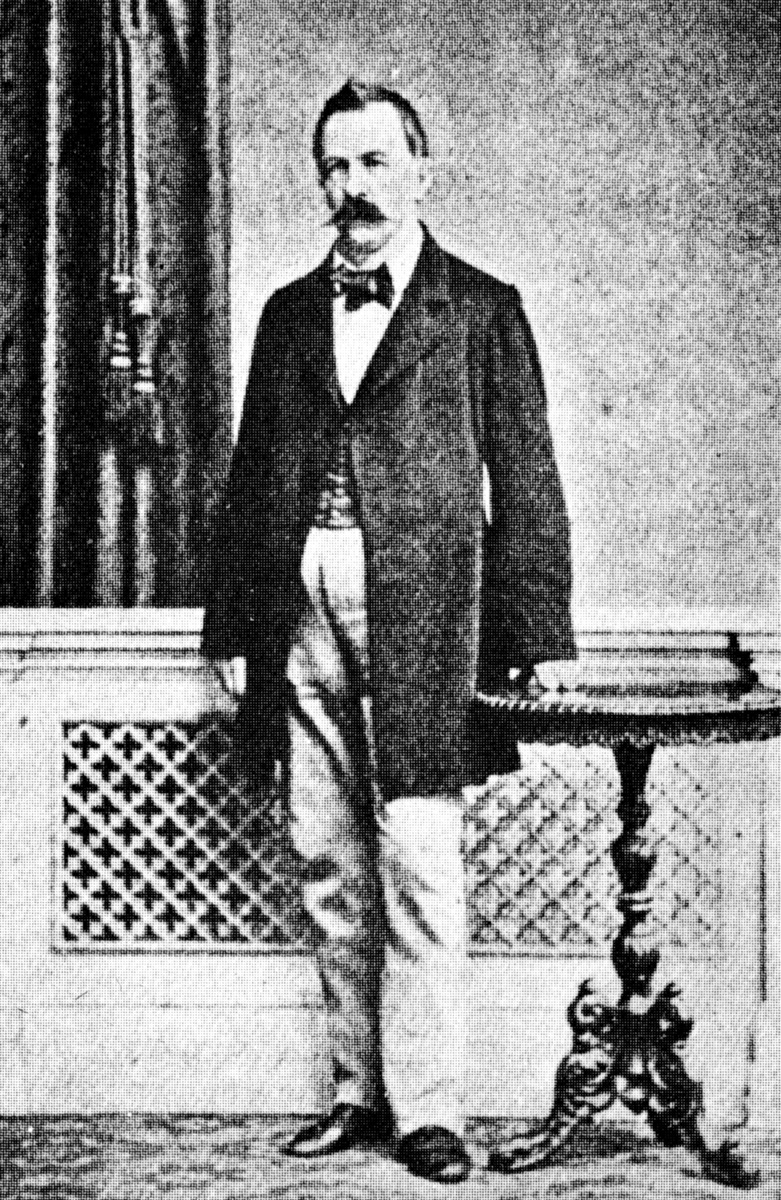
German entomologist Hermann Loew (1807–1879), who formally described Trypeta fasciolata in 1863.

Coelotrypes fasciolata was originally described by Hermann Loew in 1863. The genus Coelotrypes was later established by Italian entomologist Mario Bezzi in 1923, into which Loew's species was placed.

The specific epithet fasciolata is derived from the Latin fasciola, meaning "small band" or "stripe", a common reference to the patterned wings characteristic of many species in the family Tephritidae.

== Distribution ==
The species is endemic to sub-Saharan Africa. Like all members of the genus Coelotrypes, it inhabits tropical and subtropical African environments typical of the family Tephritidae.
