= Stemonocera corruca =

Scientific classification
- Kingdom: Animalia
- Phylum: Arthropoda
- Class: Insecta
- Order: Diptera
- Family: Tephritidae
- Genus: Stemonocera
- Species: S. corruca

Binomial name
- Stemonocera corruca (Hering, 1937)

Species of fly

Stemonocera corruca is a species of tephritid (fruit flies) in the genus Stemonocera.
