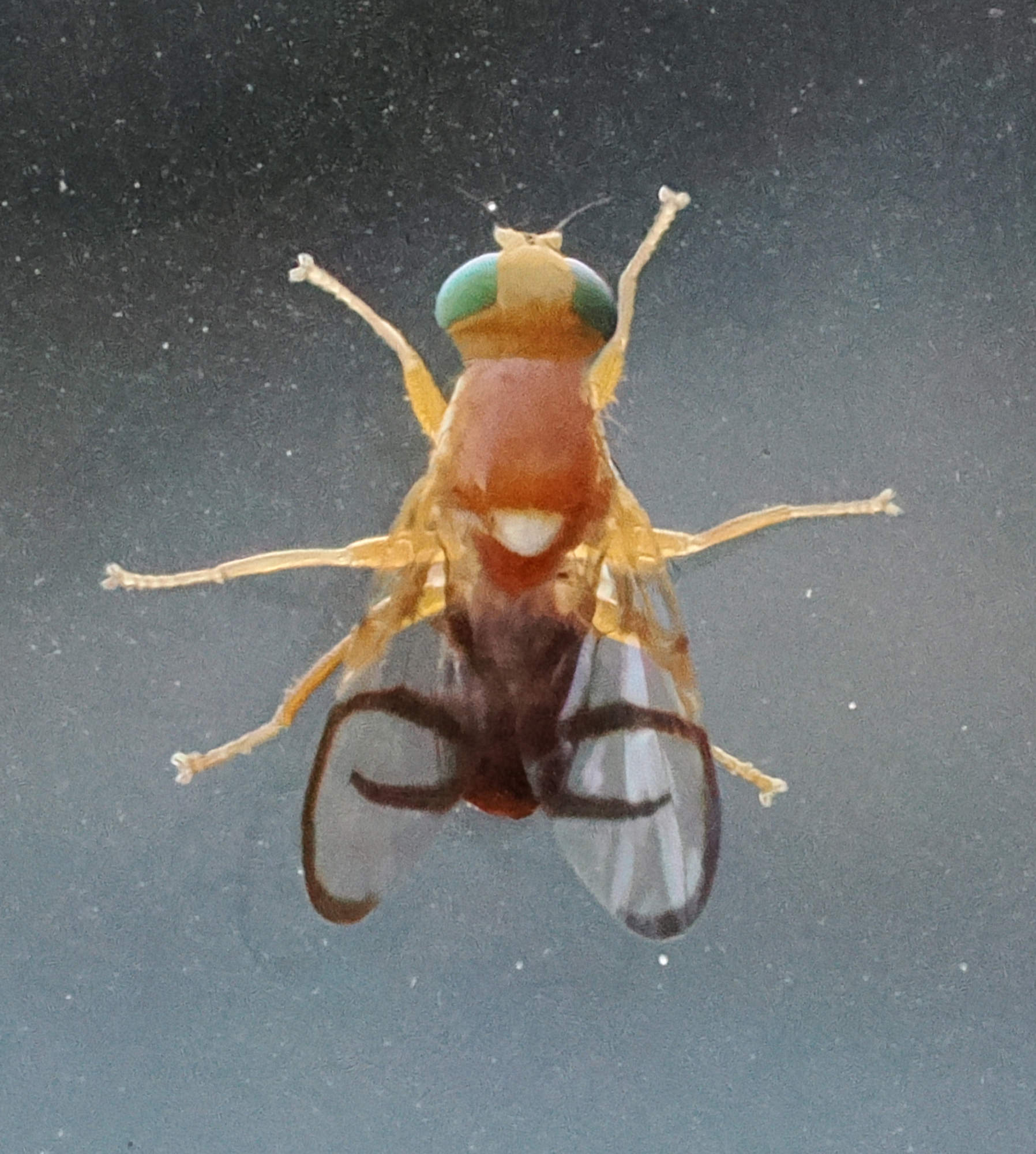

Scientific classification
- Kingdom: Animalia
- Phylum: Arthropoda
- Class: Insecta
- Order: Diptera
- Family: Tephritidae
- Genus: Paraterellia
- Species: P. superba

Binomial name
- Paraterellia superba Foote, 1960

= Paraterellia superba =

Species of fly

Paraterellia superba is a species of tephritid or fruit fly in the family Tephritidae.
