= Paramyiolia nigricornis =

Scientific classification
- Domain: Eukaryota
- Kingdom: Animalia
- Phylum: Arthropoda
- Class: Insecta
- Order: Diptera
- Family: Tephritidae
- Genus: Paramyiolia
- Species: P. nigricornis

Binomial name
- Paramyiolia nigricornis (Doane, 1899)

Synonyms
- Aciura nigricornis Doane, 1899

Species of fly

Paramyiolia nigricornis is a species of fruit fly in the family Tephritidae.
