= Myoleja limata =

Scientific classification
- Kingdom: Animalia
- Phylum: Arthropoda
- Class: Insecta
- Order: Diptera
- Family: Tephritidae
- Genus: Myoleja
- Species: M. limata

Binomial name
- Myoleja limata (Coquillett, 1899)

Species of fly

Myoleja limata is a species of tephritid or fruit flies in the genus Myoleja of the family Tephritidae.
