= Coelopacidia cylindrica =

Scientific classification
- Kingdom: Animalia
- Phylum: Arthropoda
- Clade: Pancrustacea
- Class: Insecta
- Order: Diptera
- Family: Tephritidae
- Genus: Coelopacidia
- Species: C. cylindrica

Binomial name
- Coelopacidia cylindrica (Walker, 1853)

Synonyms
- Trypeta cylindrica Walker, 1853; Chyliza cylindrica (Walker, 1853)

Species of fly

Coelopacidia cylindrica is a species of tephritid or fruit flies in the genus Coelopacidia of the family Tephritidae.
