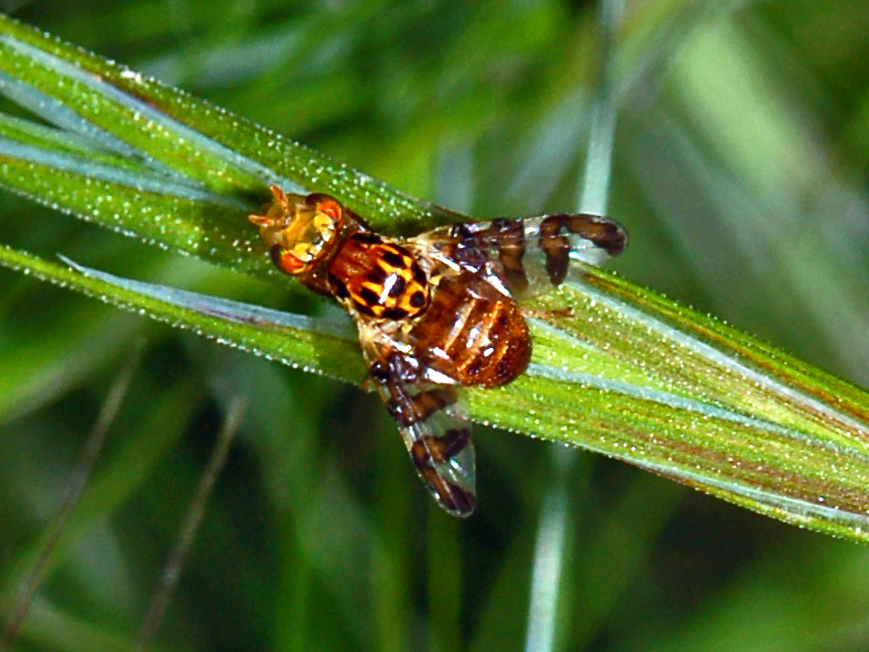

Scientific classification
- Kingdom: Animalia
- Phylum: Arthropoda
- Clade: Pancrustacea
- Class: Insecta
- Order: Diptera
- Family: Tephritidae
- Genus: Carpomya
- Species: C. wiedemanni

Binomial name
- Carpomya wiedemanni (Meigen, 1826)

Synonyms
- Goniglossum wiedemanni (Meigen, 1826); Goniglossum wiedmanni (Meigen, 1826); Trypeta wiedemanni Meigen, 1826; Goniglossum wiedermanni Foote, 1984; Goniglossum wiedermanni (Meigen, 1826); Goniglossum wiedmanni Rondani, 1856; Tephritis bryoniae Meigen, 1826

= Carpomya wiedemanni =

Species of fly

Carpomya wiedemanni is a species of tephritid or fruit flies in the family Tephritidae.

== Taxonomy ==
This species is sometimes included in the genus Goniglossum.

== Description ==
Carpomya wiedemanni can reach a body length of 3.5–5.1 millimetres (0.14–0.20 in) in male, of 4.5–5.5 millimetres (0.18–0.22 in) in females. Wings can reach a length of 2.8–3.8 millimetres (0.11–0.15 in) in males, of 3.6–4.5 millimetres (0.14–0.18 in). These fruit flies have an elongate head, with a long proboscis. Thorax is yellowish with dark brown markings. Scutellum has three usually isolated black spots. Abdomen is yellow to reddish-brown, without black bands, but with golden-yellow margins of tergites 2–4 in male, 2–5 in female. The last tergite is bare and shiny. Wings are hyaline, with brown bands.

== Distribution ==
This species is present in Austria, Belgium, the British Isles, France, Germany, Hungary, Italy, Russia, Spain, Switzerland, and in the Near East.

== Biology ==
Adults can be seen from May to August, with a peak period in July. They feed on nectar of Bryonia dioica.

This species is host-specific to white bryony (Bryonia alba, Bryonia dioica) (Cucurbitaceae), in which berries larvae develop.
