= Hardyadrama =

Scientific classification
- Kingdom: Animalia
- Phylum: Arthropoda
- Class: Insecta
- Order: Diptera
- Family: Tephritidae
- Subfamily: Trypetinae
- Genus: Hardyadrama

Genus of flies

Hardyadrama is a genus of tephritid or fruit flies in the family Tephritidae.

The genus is listed in the global systematic database of fruit flies compiled by Allen L. Norrbom and colleagues. Taxonomic information on the genus is also catalogued in international biodiversity databases such as GBIF.
