= Chetostoma completum =

Scientific classification
- Kingdom: Animalia
- Phylum: Arthropoda
- Class: Insecta
- Order: Diptera
- Family: Tephritidae
- Genus: Chetostoma
- Species: C. completum

Binomial name
- Chetostoma completum Kapoor, Malla & Ghosh, 1979

Species of fly

Chetostoma completum is a species of tephritid or fruit flies in the genus Chetostoma of the family Tephritidae.
