= Acidiella contraria =

Scientific classification
- Kingdom: Animalia
- Phylum: Arthropoda
- Class: Insecta
- Order: Diptera
- Family: Tephritidae
- Genus: Acidiella
- Species: A. contraria

Binomial name
- Acidiella contraria (Walker, 1853)

Synonyms
- Trypeta contraria Walker, 1853

Species of fly

Acidiella contraria is a species of tephritid or fruit flies in the genus Acidiella of the family Tephritidae.
