= Oedicarena tetanops =

Scientific classification
- Kingdom: Animalia
- Phylum: Arthropoda
- Clade: Pancrustacea
- Class: Insecta
- Order: Diptera
- Family: Tephritidae
- Genus: Oedicarena
- Species: O. tetanops

Binomial name
- Oedicarena tetanops (Loew, 1873)

Species of fly

Oedicarena tetanops is a species of tephritid or fruit flies in the genus Oedicarena of the family Tephritidae.
