= Rhagoletotrypeta =

Scientific classification
- Domain: Eukaryota
- Kingdom: Animalia
- Phylum: Arthropoda
- Class: Insecta
- Order: Diptera
- Family: Tephritidae
- Subfamily: Trypetinae
- Tribe: Carpomyini
- Genus: Rhagoletotrypeta; Aczél, 1951

Genus of flies

Rhagoletotrypeta is a genus of tephritid fruit flies in the family Tephritidae. These species originated in the Americas.

== Species ==
This genus includes the following species:

- Rhagoletotrypeta annulata Aczel, 1954
- Rhagoletotrypeta argentinensis
- Rhagoletotrypeta intermedia Norrbom, 1994
- Rhagoletotrypeta morgantei Norrbom, 1994
- Rhagoletotrypeta parallela Norrbom, 1994
- Rhagoletotrypeta pastranai Aczel, 1954
- Rhagoletotrypeta rohweri Foote, 1966
- Rhagoletotrypeta uniformis Steyskal, 1981
- Rhagoletotrypeta xanthogastra Aczel, 1951
