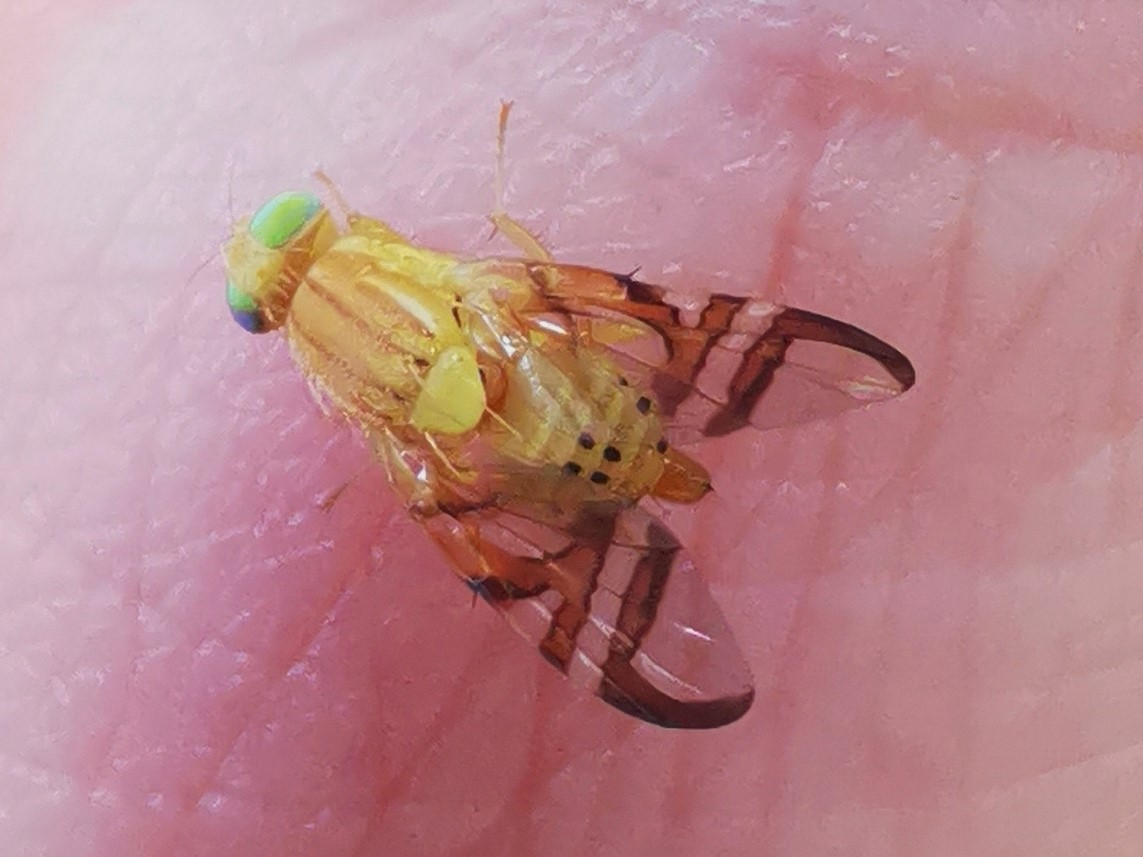

Scientific classification
- Kingdom: Animalia
- Phylum: Arthropoda
- Clade: Pancrustacea
- Class: Insecta
- Order: Diptera
- Family: Tephritidae
- Subfamily: Trypetinae
- Genus: Acidoxantha; Hendel, 1914

Type species
- Acidoxantha punctiventris Hendel, 1914

= Acidoxantha =

Genus of flies

Acidoxantha is a genus of tephritid or fruit flies in the family Tephritidae.

== Acidoxantha species ==
- Acidoxantha assita (Hardy, 1973)
- Acidoxantha balabacensis (Hardy, 1970)
- Acidoxantha bifasciata (Hardy, 1987)
- Acidoxantha bisinuata (Hancock, 1985)
- Acidoxantha bombacis (de Meijere, 1938)
- Acidoxantha galibeedu (David & Ramadi, 2014)
- Acidoxantha hibisci (Hardy, 1974)
- Acidoxantha minor (Hardy, 1974)
- Acidoxantha nana (Hering, 1940)
- Acidoxantha punctiventris (Hendel, 1914)
- Acidoxantha quadrivittata (Hardy, 1974)
- Acidoxantha quinaria (Permkam & Hancock, 1995)
- Acidoxantha paratotoflava (Maneesh & Hancock, 2026)
- Acidoxantha totoflava (Hardy, 1973)
