= Hemilea dimidiata =

Scientific classification
- Domain: Eukaryota
- Kingdom: Animalia
- Phylum: Arthropoda
- Class: Insecta
- Order: Diptera
- Family: Tephritidae
- Genus: Hemilea
- Species: H. dimidiata

Binomial name
- Hemilea dimidiata (Costa 1844)

Species of fly

Hemilea dimidiata is a species of tephritid or fruit flies in the genus Hemilea of the family Tephritidae.
