= Rhagoletotrypeta rohweri =

Scientific classification
- Domain: Eukaryota
- Kingdom: Animalia
- Phylum: Arthropoda
- Class: Insecta
- Order: Diptera
- Family: Tephritidae
- Genus: Rhagoletotrypeta
- Species: R. rohweri

Binomial name
- Rhagoletotrypeta rohweri Foote, 1966

Species of fly

Rhagoletotrypeta rohweri is a species of fruit fly in the family Tephritidae.
