= Acinoeuphranta =

Scientific classification
- Kingdom: Animalia
- Phylum: Arthropoda
- Class: Insecta
- Order: Diptera
- Family: Tephritidae
- Subfamily: Trypetinae
- Genus: Acinoeuphranta

Genus of flies

Acinoeuphranta is a genus of tephritid or fruit flies in the family Tephritidae.

There is only one species placed in Acinoeuphranta, Acinoeuphranta zeylanica (Hardy, 1971).
