= Oedicarena =

Scientific classification
- Domain: Eukaryota
- Kingdom: Animalia
- Phylum: Arthropoda
- Class: Insecta
- Order: Diptera
- Family: Tephritidae
- Subfamily: Trypetinae
- Tribe: Carpomyini
- Genus: Oedicarena; Loew, 1873

Genus of flies

Oedicarena is a genus of tephritid or fruit flies in the family Tephritidae.

== Species ==
The genus contains the following species.

- Oedicarena beameri
- Oedicarena latifrons
- Oedicarena nigra
- Oedicarena persuasa
- Oedicarena tetanops
