= Alsangelisca =

Scientific classification
- Kingdom: Animalia
- Phylum: Arthropoda
- Class: Insecta
- Order: Diptera
- Family: Tephritidae
- Subfamily: Trypetinae
- Genus: Alsangelisca; Ito, 1984

Type species
- Philophylla takeuchii Ito, 1951

Genus of flies

Alsangelisca is a genus of tephritid or fruit flies in the family Tephritidae.

There is only one species placed under the genus Alsangelisca, Alsangelisca takeuchii (Ito, 1951). It is found in the Palearctic realm, with the type specimen being found in Japan, and other specimens being found in Far East Russia and Korea.
