= Paraterellia =

Scientific classification
- Domain: Eukaryota
- Kingdom: Animalia
- Phylum: Arthropoda
- Class: Insecta
- Order: Diptera
- Family: Tephritidae
- Subfamily: Trypetinae
- Tribe: Carpomyini
- Genus: Paraterellia; Foote, 1960

Genus of flies

Paraterellia is a genus of tephritid or fruit flies in the family Tephritidae.

== Species ==
The genus contains the following species.

- Paraterellia immaculata
- Paraterellia superba
- Paraterellia varipennis
- Paraterellia ypsilon
