= Craspedoxanthitea =

Scientific classification
- Kingdom: Animalia
- Phylum: Arthropoda
- Clade: Pancrustacea
- Class: Insecta
- Order: Diptera
- Family: Tephritidae
- Subfamily: Trypetinae
- Tribe: Trypetini
- Genus: Craspedoxanthitea; Hardy, 1987

Genus of flies

Craspedoxanthitea is a genus of tephritid or fruit flies in the family Tephritidae.

== Species ==
It contains the following species:

- Craspedoxanthitea flaviseta (Hardy, 1987)
- Craspedoxanthitea indistincta (Meijere, 1913)
