= Soita =

Scientific classification
- Kingdom: Animalia
- Phylum: Arthropoda
- Class: Insecta
- Order: Diptera
- Family: Tephritidae
- Subfamily: Trypetinae
- Genus: Soita

Genus of flies

Soita is a genus of tephritid or fruit flies in the family Tephritidae. Phantasmiella is considered to be a synonym of Soita.
