= Rhagoletotrypeta parallela =

Scientific classification
- Kingdom: Animalia
- Phylum: Arthropoda
- Class: Insecta
- Order: Diptera
- Family: Tephritidae
- Genus: Rhagoletotrypeta
- Species: R. parallela

Binomial name
- Rhagoletotrypeta parallela Norrbom, 1994

Species of fly

Rhagoletotrypeta parallela is a species of tephritid or fruit flies in the genus Rhagoletotrypeta of the family Tephritidae.
