= Rhagoletotrypeta pastranai =

Scientific classification
- Kingdom: Animalia
- Phylum: Arthropoda
- Class: Insecta
- Order: Diptera
- Family: Tephritidae
- Genus: Rhagoletotrypeta
- Species: R. pastranai

Binomial name
- Rhagoletotrypeta pastranai Aczél, 1954

Species of fly

Rhagoletotrypeta pastranai is a species of tephritid or fruit flies in the genus Rhagoletotrypeta of the family Tephritidae.
