= Paraterellia varipennis =

Scientific classification
- Kingdom: Animalia
- Phylum: Arthropoda
- Class: Insecta
- Order: Diptera
- Family: Tephritidae
- Genus: Paraterellia
- Species: P. varipennis

Binomial name
- Paraterellia varipennis (Coquillett, 1902)

Species of fly

Paraterellia varipennis is a species of tephritid or fruit flies in the genus Paraterellia of the family Tephritidae.
