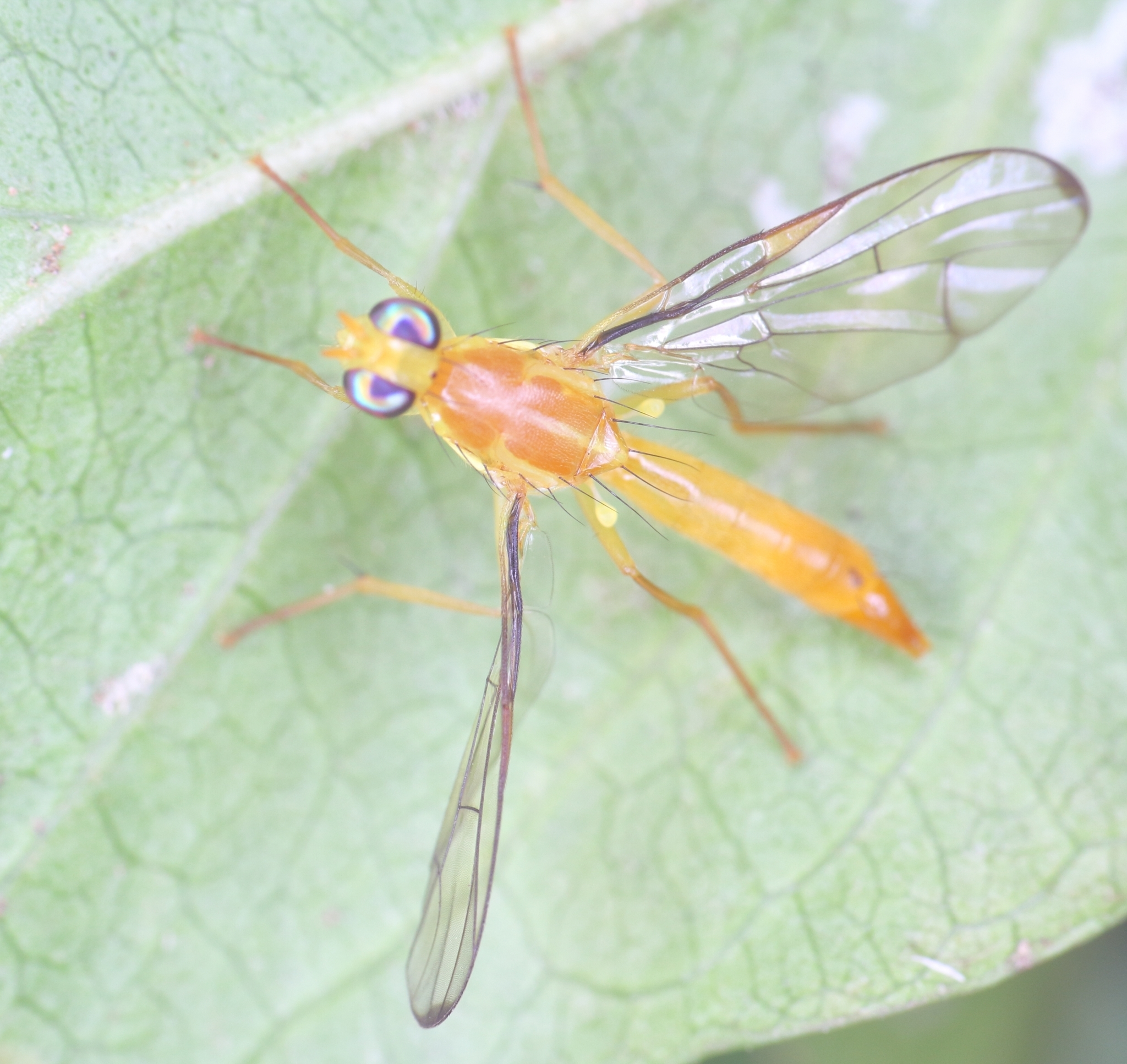
- Coelopacidia strigata

Scientific classification
- Kingdom: Animalia
- Phylum: Arthropoda
- Clade: Pancrustacea
- Class: Insecta
- Order: Diptera
- Family: Tephritidae
- Subfamily: Trypetinae
- Tribe: Adramini
- Genus: Coelopacidia; Enderlein, 1911

Type species
- Coelopacidia madagascariensis Enderlein, 1911

Synonyms
- Stenotrypeta Enderlein, 1920

= Coelopacidia =

Genus of flies

Coelopacidia is a genus of tephritid (or fruit flies) in the family Tephritidae (subfamily Trypetinae, tribe Adramini). The genus includes ten species, found primarily in the Afrotropical region. Their larvae are stem-borer pests, affecting the stems and roots of plants in the sunflower (Asteraceae) and carrot (Apiaceae) families.

== Species ==
- Coelopacidia apicalis Hendel, 1928
- Coelopacidia carinata Hendel, 1928
- Coelopacidia cylindrica (Walker, 1853)
- Coelopacidia madagascariensis Enderlein, 1911
- Coelopacidia marriotti (Munro, 1935)
- Coelopacidia melanostigma Bezzi, 1920
- Coelopacidia punctum (Enderlein, 1920)
- Coelopacidia strigata Bezzi, 1920
- Coelopacidia torrida (Enderlein, 1920)
- Coelopacidia vivax (Munro, 1933)
