= Myoleja desperata =

Scientific classification
- Kingdom: Animalia
- Phylum: Arthropoda
- Class: Insecta
- Order: Diptera
- Family: Tephritidae
- Genus: Myoleja
- Species: M. desperata

Binomial name
- Myoleja desperata (Hering, 1938)

Species of fly

Myoleja desperata is a species of tephritid or fruit flies in the genus Myoleja of the family Tephritidae.
