= Craspedoxanthitea indistincta =

Scientific classification
- Kingdom: Animalia
- Phylum: Arthropoda
- Clade: Pancrustacea
- Class: Insecta
- Order: Diptera
- Family: Tephritidae
- Genus: Craspedoxanthitea
- Species: C. indistincta

Binomial name
- Craspedoxanthitea indistincta (Meijere, 1913)

Species of fly

Craspedoxanthitea indistincta is a species of tephritid or fruit flies in the genus Craspedoxanthitea of the family Tephritidae.
