= Myoleja diversa =

Scientific classification
- Kingdom: Animalia
- Phylum: Arthropoda
- Class: Insecta
- Order: Diptera
- Family: Tephritidae
- Genus: Myoleja
- Species: M. diversa

Binomial name
- Myoleja diversa Wang, 1989

Species of fly

Myoleja diversa is a species of tephritid or fruit flies in the genus Myoleja of the family Tephritidae.
