= Aciuropsis =

Scientific classification
- Kingdom: Animalia
- Phylum: Arthropoda
- Class: Insecta
- Order: Diptera
- Family: Tephritidae
- Subfamily: Trypetinae
- Genus: Aciuropsis; Hardy, 1974

Type species
- Aciuropsis pusio Hardy, 1974

Genus of flies

Aciuropsis is a genus of tephritid or fruit flies in the family Tephritidae.

There is only one species placed under the genus Aciuropsis, Aciuropsis pusio (Hardy, 1974).
