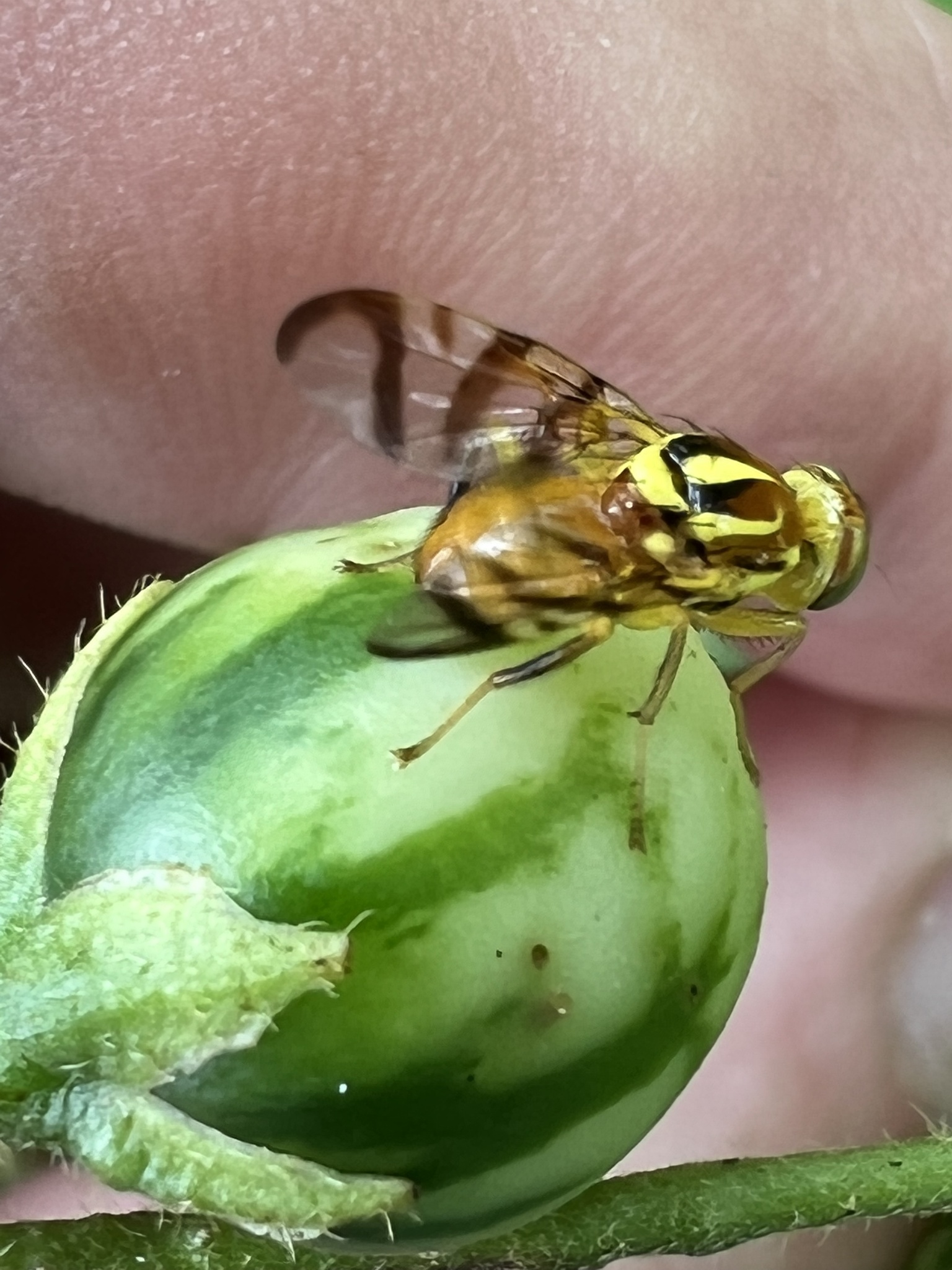
- Zonosemata electa, Virginia

Scientific classification
- Kingdom: Animalia
- Phylum: Arthropoda
- Clade: Pancrustacea
- Class: Insecta
- Order: Diptera
- Family: Tephritidae
- Genus: Zonosemata
- Species: Z. electa

Binomial name
- Zonosemata electa (Say, 1830)

= Zonosemata electa =

Species of fly

Zonosemata electa (also known as pepper maggot) is a species of tephritid or fruit flies in the genus Zonosemata of the family Tephritidae. It is found in North America.
