= Guaianaza =

Scientific classification
- Kingdom: Animalia
- Phylum: Arthropoda
- Class: Insecta
- Order: Lepidoptera
- Family: Nymphalidae
- Subtribe: Euptychiina
- Genus: Guaianaza; Freitas & Peña, 2006
- Species: G. pronophila

Binomial name
- Guaianaza pronophila (Butler, 1867)

Genus of butterflies

Guaianaza is a monotypic butterfly genus of the subfamily Satyrinae in the family Nymphalidae. Guaianaza is considered a synonym of the genus Forsterinaria Gray, 1973. Its single species, Guaianaza pronophila, is found in the Neotropical realm.
