= Rhagoletotrypeta xanthogastra =

Scientific classification
- Kingdom: Animalia
- Phylum: Arthropoda
- Class: Insecta
- Order: Diptera
- Family: Tephritidae
- Genus: Rhagoletotrypeta
- Species: R. xanthogastra

Binomial name
- Rhagoletotrypeta xanthogastra Aczél, 1951

Species of fly

Rhagoletotrypeta xanthogastra is a species of tephritid or fruit flies in the genus Rhagoletotrypeta of the family Tephritidae.
