= Tarphobregma =

Scientific classification
- Kingdom: Animalia
- Phylum: Arthropoda
- Class: Insecta
- Order: Diptera
- Family: Tephritidae
- Subfamily: Trypetinae
- Genus: Tarphobregma

Genus of flies

Tarphobregma is a genus of tephritid or fruit flies in the family Tephritidae.
