= Paraterellia immaculata =

Scientific classification
- Kingdom: Animalia
- Phylum: Arthropoda
- Class: Insecta
- Order: Diptera
- Family: Tephritidae
- Genus: Paraterellia
- Species: P. immaculata

Binomial name
- Paraterellia immaculata Blanc, 1979

Species of fly

Paraterellia immaculata is a species of tephritid or fruit flies in the genus Paraterellia of the family Tephritidae.
