= Angelogelasinus =

Scientific classification
- Kingdom: Animalia
- Phylum: Arthropoda
- Clade: Pancrustacea
- Class: Insecta
- Order: Diptera
- Family: Tephritidae
- Subfamily: Trypetinae
- Genus: Angelogelasinus; Ito, 1984

Type species
- Myiolia naganoensis Shiraki, 1933

Genus of flies

Angelogelasinus is a genus of tephritid or fruit flies in the family Tephritidae.

== Angelogelasinus species ==
- Angelogelasinus amuricola (Hendel, 1927)
- Angelogelasinus implicatus (Ito, 1984)
- Angelogelasinus naganoensis (Shiraki, 1933)
- Angelogelasinus venustus (Ito, 1984)
