= Acidoxanthopsis =

Scientific classification
- Kingdom: Animalia
- Phylum: Arthropoda
- Class: Insecta
- Order: Diptera
- Family: Tephritidae
- Subfamily: Trypetinae
- Genus: Acidoxanthopsis; Hering, 1941

Type species
- Acidoxantha advena Hering 1941

Genus of flies

Acidoxanthopsis is a genus of tephritid or fruit flies in the family Tephritidae.

There is only one species placed under the genus Acidoxanthopsis, Acidoxanthopsis advena (Hering, 1941).
