= Cristobalia =

Scientific classification
- Kingdom: Animalia
- Phylum: Arthropoda
- Clade: Pancrustacea
- Class: Insecta
- Order: Diptera
- Family: Tephritidae
- Subfamily: Trypetinae
- Genus: Cristobalia; Malloch, 1939

Genus of flies

Cristobalia is a monotypic genus of tephritid fruit flies in the family Tephritidae.
