= Rhagoletotrypeta argentinensis =

Scientific classification
- Kingdom: Animalia
- Phylum: Arthropoda
- Class: Insecta
- Order: Diptera
- Family: Tephritidae
- Genus: Rhagoletotrypeta
- Species: R. argentinensis

Binomial name
- Rhagoletotrypeta argentinensis (Aczel, 1951)

Species of fly

Rhagoletotrypeta argentinensis is a species of tephritid or fruit fly in the genus Rhagoletotrypeta of the family Tephritidae.
