= Oedicarena nigra =

Scientific classification
- Kingdom: Animalia
- Phylum: Arthropoda
- Class: Insecta
- Order: Diptera
- Family: Tephritidae
- Genus: Oedicarena
- Species: O. nigra

Binomial name
- Oedicarena nigra Hernández-Ortiz, 1988

Species of fly

Oedicarena nigra is a species of tephritid or fruit flies in the genus Oedicarena of the family Tephritidae.
