= Anastrephoides =

Scientific classification
- Kingdom: Animalia
- Phylum: Arthropoda
- Class: Insecta
- Order: Diptera
- Family: Tephritidae
- Subfamily: Trypetinae
- Genus: Anastrephoides; Hendel, 1927

Type species
- Anastrephoides gerckei Hendel, 1927

Genus of flies

Anastrephoides is a genus of tephritid or fruit flies in the family Tephritidae.

== Anastrephoides species ==
- Anastrephoides gerckei (Hendel, 1927)
- Anastrephoides matsumurai (Shiraki, 1933)
