= Myoleja angusta =

Scientific classification
- Kingdom: Animalia
- Phylum: Arthropoda
- Clade: Pancrustacea
- Class: Insecta
- Order: Diptera
- Family: Tephritidae
- Genus: Myoleja
- Species: M. angusta

Binomial name
- Myoleja angusta Wang, 1989

Species of fly

Myoleja angusta is a species of fruit flies in the genus Myoleja of the family Tephritidae.
