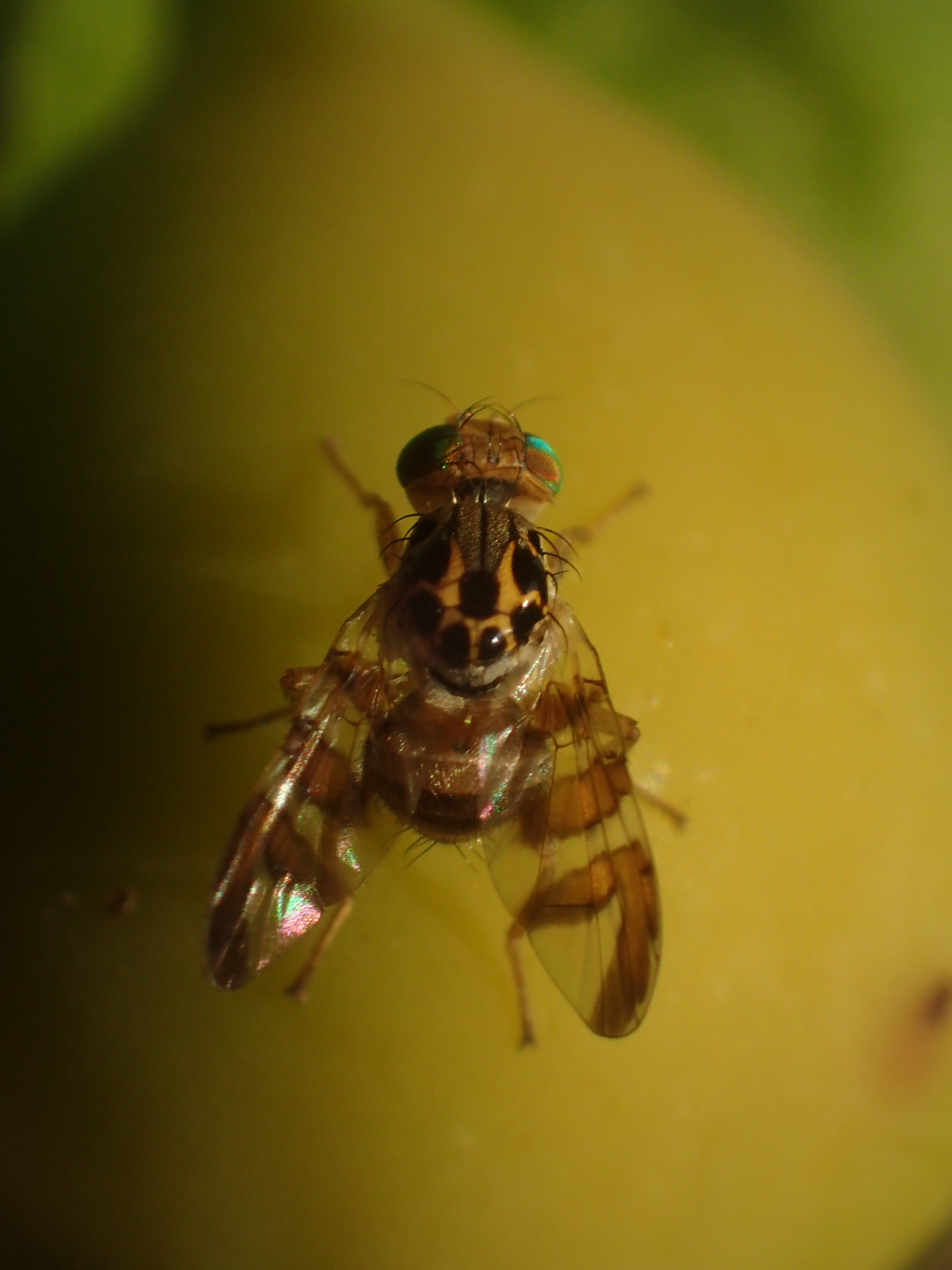
- Carpomya schineri

Scientific classification
- Kingdom: Animalia
- Phylum: Arthropoda
- Clade: Pancrustacea
- Class: Insecta
- Order: Diptera
- Family: Tephritidae
- Subfamily: Trypetinae
- Genus: Carpomya; Costa, 1854

Synonyms
- Carpomyia Rondani, 1870; Goniglossum Rondani, 1856; Gonioglossum Hendel, 1914; Myiopardalis Bezzi, 1910

= Carpomya =

Genus of flies

Carpomya is a genus of tephritid or fruit flies in the family Tephritidae.

== Species ==
- Carpomya incompleta (Becker, 1903)
- Carpomya liat (Freidberg, 2016),
- Carpomya pardalina (Bigot, 1891)
- Carpomya schineri (Loew, 1856)
- Carpomya vesuviana A. Costa, 1854
- Carpomya wiedemanni (Meigen, 1826)

Some uncertantainy about the limits to the genus include difference in placement of:

- Goniglossum wiedemanni (Meigen, 1826) (instead of Carpomya wiedemanni (Meigen, 1826))
- Myiopardalis pardalina (Bigot, 1891) (instead of Carpomya pardalina (Bigot, 1891))
