= Oedicarena persuasa =

Scientific classification
- Kingdom: Animalia
- Phylum: Arthropoda
- Class: Insecta
- Order: Diptera
- Family: Tephritidae
- Genus: Oedicarena
- Species: O. persuasa

Binomial name
- Oedicarena persuasa (Osten Sacken, 1877)

Species of fly

Oedicarena persuasa is a species of tephritid or fruit flies in the genus Oedicarena of the family Tephritidae.
