= Oedicarena latifrons =

Scientific classification
- Kingdom: Animalia
- Phylum: Arthropoda
- Clade: Pancrustacea
- Class: Insecta
- Order: Diptera
- Family: Tephritidae
- Genus: Oedicarena
- Species: O. latifrons

Binomial name
- Oedicarena latifrons (Wulp, 1899)

Synonyms
- Spilographa latifrons Wulp, 1899; Spilographa obfuscata Wulp, 1899

Species of fly

Oedicarena latifrons is a species of tephritid or fruit flies in the genus Oedicarena of the family Tephritidae.
