= Myoleja mailaka =

Scientific classification
- Kingdom: Animalia
- Phylum: Arthropoda
- Class: Insecta
- Order: Diptera
- Family: Tephritidae
- Genus: Myoleja
- Species: M. mailaka

Binomial name
- Myoleja mailaka Hancock, 1985

Species of fly

Myoleja mailaka is a species of tephritid or fruit flies in the genus Myoleja of the family Tephritidae.
