= Coelotrypes =

Scientific classification
- Kingdom: Animalia
- Phylum: Arthropoda
- Clade: Pancrustacea
- Class: Insecta
- Order: Diptera
- Family: Tephritidae
- Subfamily: Trypetinae
- Tribe: Adramini
- Genus: Coelotrypes; Bezzi, 1923

Type species
- Coelotrypes vittata Bezzi, 1923

Synonyms
- Rhacochlaena

Genus of flies

Coelotrypes is a genus of tephritid or fruit flies in the family Tephritidae.

Species accepted within the genus include:

- Coelotrypes circumscripta (Hering, 1941)
- Coelotrypes fasciolata (Loew, 1863)
- Coelotrypes flavina (Hering, 1941)
- Coelotrypes hammersteini (Enderlein, 1911)
- Coelotrypes inumbrata (Munro, 1957)
- Coelotrypes latilimbata (Enderlein, 1911)
- Coelotrypes luteifasciata (Senior-White, 1922)
- Coelotrypes major (Bezzi, 1924)
- Coelotrypes meremmiae David & Hancock, 2019
- Coelotrypes nigricornutua Hering, 1942
- Coelotrypes nigriventris Bezzi, 1924
- Coelotrypes pallida Bezzi, 1924
- Coelotrypes paralatilimbatus David & Hancock, 2019
- Coelotrypes pulchella (Bezzi, 1920)
- Coelotrypes pulchellina (Hering, 1940)
- Coelotrypes punctilabris (Bezzi, 1928)
- Coelotrypes ripleyi Munro, 1933
- Coelotrypes simplex (Bezzi, 1924)
- Coelotrypes vittata Bezzi, 1923
