= Ornithoschema =

Scientific classification
- Kingdom: Animalia
- Phylum: Arthropoda
- Clade: Pancrustacea
- Class: Insecta
- Order: Diptera
- Family: Tephritidae
- Subfamily: Trypetinae
- Genus: Ornithoschema; Meijere, 1914

Synonyms
- Cycasia Malloch, 1942

Genus of flies

Ornithoschema is a genus of tephritid or fruit flies in the family Tephritidae.
