= Myoleja rhino =

Scientific classification
- Domain: Eukaryota
- Kingdom: Animalia
- Phylum: Arthropoda
- Class: Insecta
- Order: Diptera
- Family: Tephritidae
- Genus: Myoleja
- Species: M. rhino

Binomial name
- Myoleja rhino Steyskal, 1972

Species of fly

Myoleja rhino is a species of tephritid or fruit flies in the genus Myoleja of the family Tephritidae.
