= Chetostoma mundum =

Scientific classification
- Kingdom: Animalia
- Phylum: Arthropoda
- Class: Insecta
- Order: Diptera
- Family: Tephritidae
- Genus: Chetostoma
- Species: C. mundum

Binomial name
- Chetostoma mundum (Ito, 1953)

Species of fly

Chetostoma mundum is a species of tephritid or fruit flies in the genus Chetostoma of the family Tephritidae.
