= Hemilea =

Scientific classification
- Kingdom: Animalia
- Phylum: Arthropoda
- Clade: Pancrustacea
- Class: Insecta
- Order: Diptera
- Family: Tephritidae
- Subfamily: Trypetinae
- Tribe: Trypetini
- Genus: Hemilea; Loew, 1862

Species
- Hemilea dimidiata

Synonyms
- Hyleurinus Ito, 1956

Genus of flies

Hemilea is a genus of tephritid or fruit flies in the family Tephritidae. Hyleurinus is currently considered a synonym of Hemilea.
