= Paramyiolia =

Scientific classification
- Domain: Eukaryota
- Kingdom: Animalia
- Phylum: Arthropoda
- Class: Insecta
- Order: Diptera
- Family: Tephritidae
- Subfamily: Trypetinae
- Tribe: Trypetini
- Genus: Paramyiolia; Shiraki, 1933

Genus of flies

Paramyiolia is a genus of tephritid or fruit flies in the family Tephritidae.

== Species ==
These four species belong to the genus Paramyiolia:

- Paramyiolia cornuta (Ito, 1984)^{i c g}
- Paramyiolia nigricornis (Doane, 1899)^{i c g b}
- Paramyiolia rhino (Steyskal, 1972)^{i c g}
- Paramyiolia takeuchii Shiraki, 1933^{i c g}

Data sources: i = ITIS, c = Catalogue of Life, g = GBIF, b = Bugguide.net
