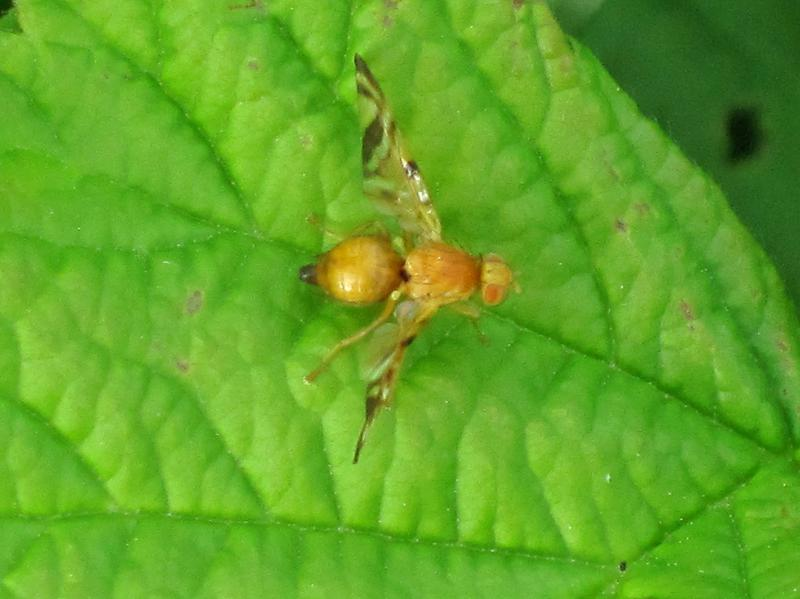
- Myoleja lucida

Scientific classification
- Domain: Eukaryota
- Kingdom: Animalia
- Phylum: Arthropoda
- Class: Insecta
- Order: Diptera
- Family: Tephritidae
- Subfamily: Trypetinae
- Tribe: Trypetini
- Genus: Myoleja; Rondani, 1856

= Myoleja =

Genus of flies

Myoleja is a genus of tephritid or fruit flies in the family Tephritidae.

== Species ==
The genus contains the following species:

- Myoleja angusta
- Myoleja bicuneata
- Myoleja bimaculata
- Myoleja boninensis
- Myoleja chuanensis
- Myoleja contemnens
- Myoleja desperata
- Myoleja discreta
- Myoleja disjuncta
- Myoleja diversa
- Myoleja ismayi
- Myoleja limata
- Myoleja lucida
- Myoleja mailaka
- Myoleja megaloba
- Myoleja mindanaoensis
- Myoleja nigricornis
- Myoleja nigripennis
- Myoleja nitida
- Myoleja reclusa
- Myoleja rhino
- Myoleja sandrangato
- Myoleja setigera
- Myoleja sinensis
- Myoleja tsaratanana
- Myoleja unicuneata
