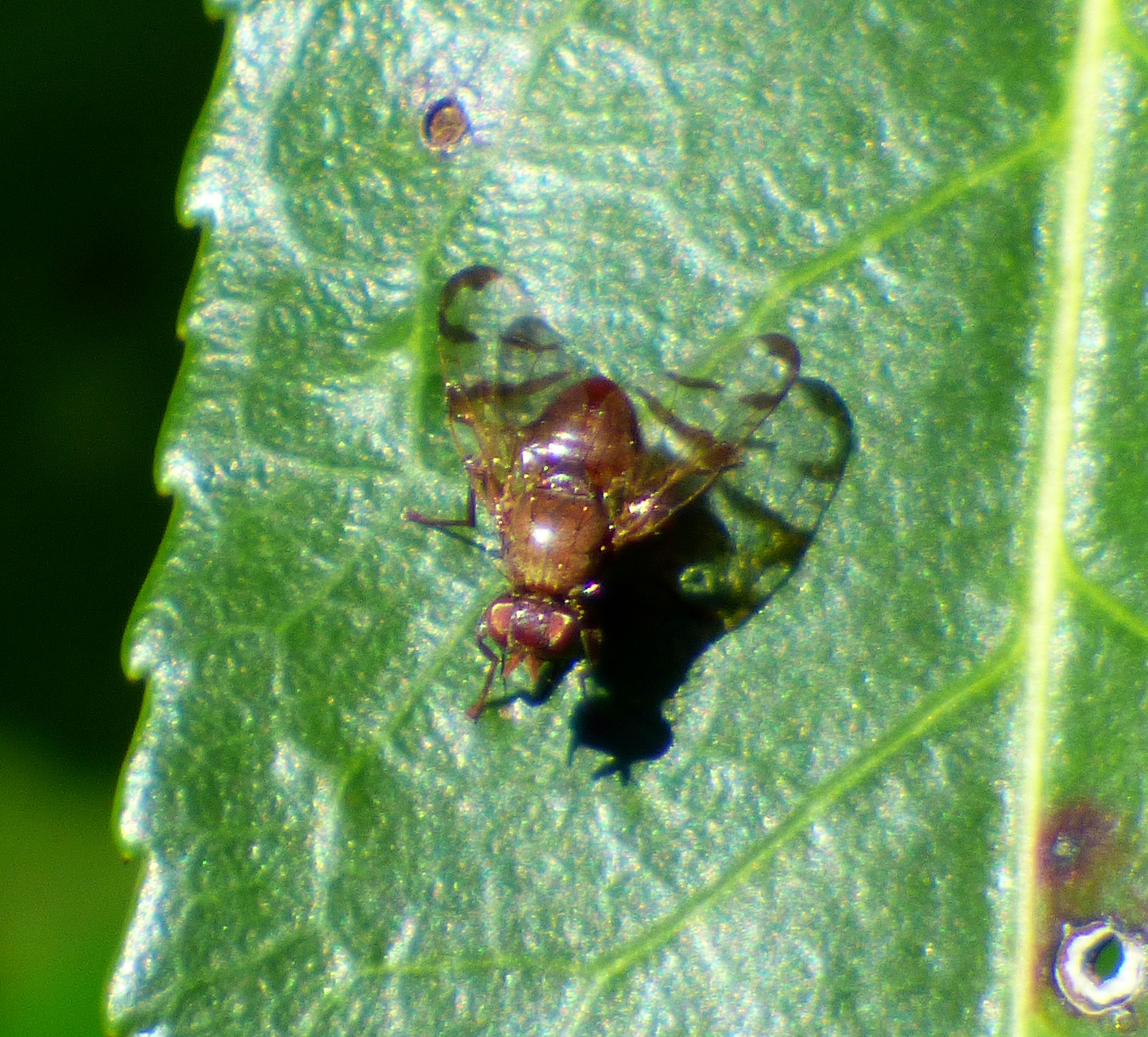

Scientific classification
- Kingdom: Animalia
- Phylum: Arthropoda
- Class: Insecta
- Order: Diptera
- Family: Tephritidae
- Genus: Chetostoma
- Species: C. curvinerve

Binomial name
- Chetostoma curvinerve Rondani, 1856

= Chetostoma curvinerve =

Species of fly

Chetostoma curvinerve is a species of tephritid or fruit flies in the genus Chetostoma of the family Tephritidae.
