= Pelmatops =

Scientific classification
- Kingdom: Animalia
- Phylum: Arthropoda
- Class: Insecta
- Order: Diptera
- Family: Tephritidae
- Subfamily: Trypetinae
- Genus: Pelmatops

Genus of flies

Pelmatops is a genus of tephritid fruit flies. They are sexually dimorphic, with females having shorter eye stalks than males. Eggs are usually laid in Rubus plants, wherein a larva usually lives within the stem of the plant until pupation.

== Species ==
- Pelmatops fukienensis Zia & Chen, 1954
- Pelmatops ichneumone Westwood, 1850
