= Magnimyiolia =

Scientific classification
- Kingdom: Animalia
- Phylum: Arthropoda
- Class: Insecta
- Order: Diptera
- Family: Tephritidae
- Subfamily: Trypetinae
- Genus: Magnimyiolia

Synonyms
- Agaristina Hering, 1953; Nemoriludia Ito, 1984

Genus of flies

Magnimyiolia is a genus of tephritid or fruit flies in the family Tephritidae.
