= Chetostoma miraculosum =

Scientific classification
- Kingdom: Animalia
- Phylum: Arthropoda
- Class: Insecta
- Order: Diptera
- Family: Tephritidae
- Genus: Chetostoma
- Species: C. miraculosum

Binomial name
- Chetostoma miraculosum (Hering, 1938)

Species of fly

Chetostoma miraculosum is a species of tephritid or fruit flies in the genus Chetostoma of the family Tephritidae.
