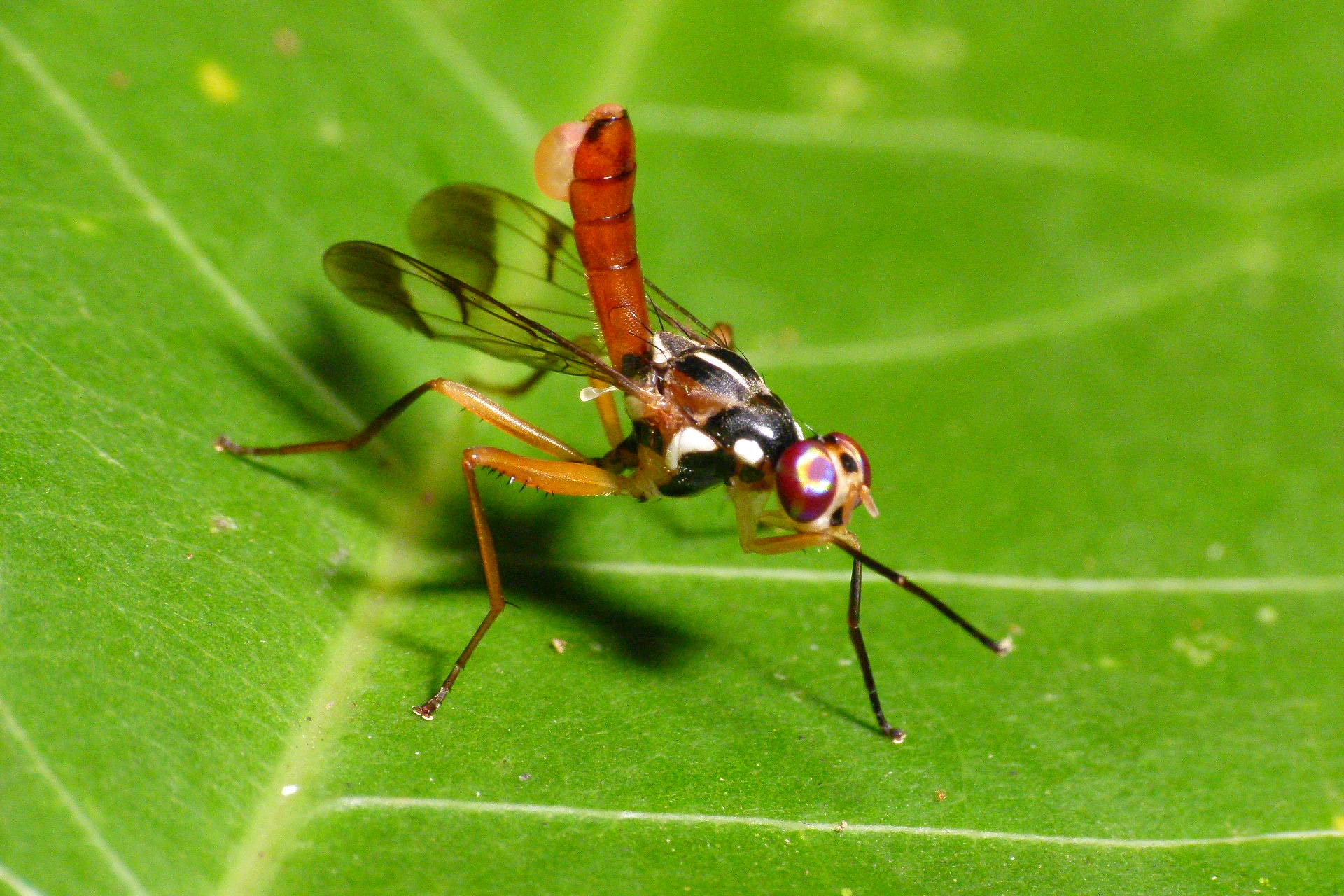
- Adrama austeni (India)

Scientific classification
- Domain: Eukaryota
- Kingdom: Animalia
- Phylum: Arthropoda
- Class: Insecta
- Order: Diptera
- Family: Tephritidae
- Subfamily: Trypetinae
- Tribe: Adramini
- Genus: Adrama; Walker, 1859

Type species
- Adrama selecta Walker, 1859

Synonyms
- Acanthipeza Rondani, 1875

= Adrama =

Genus of flies

Adrama is a genus of tephritid or fruit flies in the family Tephritidae. Some species like Adrama austeni are found in tea plantations, where they can cause some damage.
