= Acidiostigma =

Scientific classification
- Kingdom: Animalia
- Phylum: Arthropoda
- Clade: Pancrustacea
- Class: Insecta
- Order: Diptera
- Family: Tephritidae
- Subfamily: Trypetinae
- Genus: Acidiostigma; Hendel, 1927

Type species
- Myiolia longipennis Hendel, 1927

Synonyms
- Parahypenidium Shiraki, 1933; Shiracidia Ito, 1984

Genus of flies

Acidiostigma is a genus of tephritid or fruit flies in the family Tephritidae.

== Acidiostigma species ==
- Acidiostigma amoenum (Wang, 1990)
- Acidiostigma apicale (Bezzi, 1913)
- Acidiostigma bimaculatum (Wang, 1998)
- Acidiostigma bomiensis (Wang, 1998)
- Acidiostigma brevigaster (Han & Wang, 1997)
- Acidiostigma brunneum (Wang, 1990)
- Acidiostigma cheni (Han & Wang, 1997)
- Acidiostigma harmandi (Seguy, 1934)
- Acidiostigma longipenne (Hendel, 1927)
- Acidiostigma lucens (Munro, 1935)
- Acidiostigma montanum (Wang, 1998)
- Acidiostigma nigritum (Wang, 1990)
- Acidiostigma nigrofasciola (Chen & Zao, 2016)
- Acidiostigma omeium (Han & Wang, 1997)
- Acidiostigma polyfasciatum (Miyake, 1919)
- Acidiostigma postsignatum (Chen, 1948)
- Acidiostigma s-nigrum (Matsumura, 1916)
- Acidiostigma sonani (Shiraki, 1933)
- Acidiostigma spimaculatum (Wang, 1993)
- Acidiostigma subpostsignatum (Chen & Zao, 2016)
- Acidiostigma tongmaiense (Chen & Zao, 2016)
- Acidiostigma voilaceum (Wang, 1990)
- Acidiostigma yoshinoi (Shiraki, 1933)
