= Myoleja tsaratanana =

Scientific classification
- Kingdom: Animalia
- Phylum: Arthropoda
- Class: Insecta
- Order: Diptera
- Family: Tephritidae
- Genus: Myoleja
- Species: M. tsaratanana

Binomial name
- Myoleja tsaratanana Hancock, 1985

Species of fly

Myoleja tsaratanana is a species of tephritid, or fruit fly, in the genus Myoleja of the family Tephritidae.
