= Chetostoma =

Scientific classification
- Domain: Eukaryota
- Kingdom: Animalia
- Phylum: Arthropoda
- Class: Insecta
- Order: Diptera
- Family: Tephritidae
- Subfamily: Trypetinae
- Tribe: Trypetini
- Genus: Chetostoma; Rondani, 1856

Type species
- Chetostoma curvinervis Rondani, 1856

Genus of flies

Chetostoma is a genus of flies in the family Tephritidae, containing the following species:

- Chetostoma admirandum
- Chetostoma californicum
- Chetostoma completum
- Chetostoma continuans
- Chetostoma curvinerve
- Chetostoma dilutum
- Chetostoma ermolenkoi
- Chetostoma interruptum
- Chetostoma japonicum
- Chetostoma melliculum
- Chetostoma mirabile
- Chetostoma miraculosum
- Chetostoma mundum
- Chetostoma rubidum
- Chetostoma stackelbergi
