= Parastenopa limata =

Scientific classification
- Domain: Eukaryota
- Kingdom: Animalia
- Phylum: Arthropoda
- Class: Insecta
- Order: Diptera
- Family: Tephritidae
- Genus: Parastenopa
- Species: P. limata

Binomial name
- Parastenopa limata (Coquillett, 1899)

Synonyms
- Aciura limata Coquillett, 1899

Species of fly

Parastenopa limata is a species of fruit fly in the family Tephritidae.
