= Stemonocera =

Scientific classification
- Domain: Eukaryota
- Kingdom: Animalia
- Phylum: Arthropoda
- Class: Insecta
- Order: Diptera
- Family: Tephritidae
- Subfamily: Trypetinae
- Tribe: Trypetini
- Genus: Stemonocera; Rondani, 1870

Genus of flies

Stemonocera is a genus of tephritid or fruit flies in the family Tephritidae.
