= Philophylla =

- Philophylla caesio

Scientific classification
- Domain: Eukaryota
- Kingdom: Animalia
- Phylum: Arthropoda
- Class: Insecta
- Order: Diptera
- Family: Tephritidae
- Subfamily: Trypetinae
- Tribe: Trypetini
- Genus: Philophylla; Rondani, 1870

Synonyms
- Feshyia Ito, 1984; Hendelina Hardy, 1951; Phillophylla Persson, 1958

Genus of flies

Philophylla is a genus of tephritid or fruit flies in the family Tephritidae.
