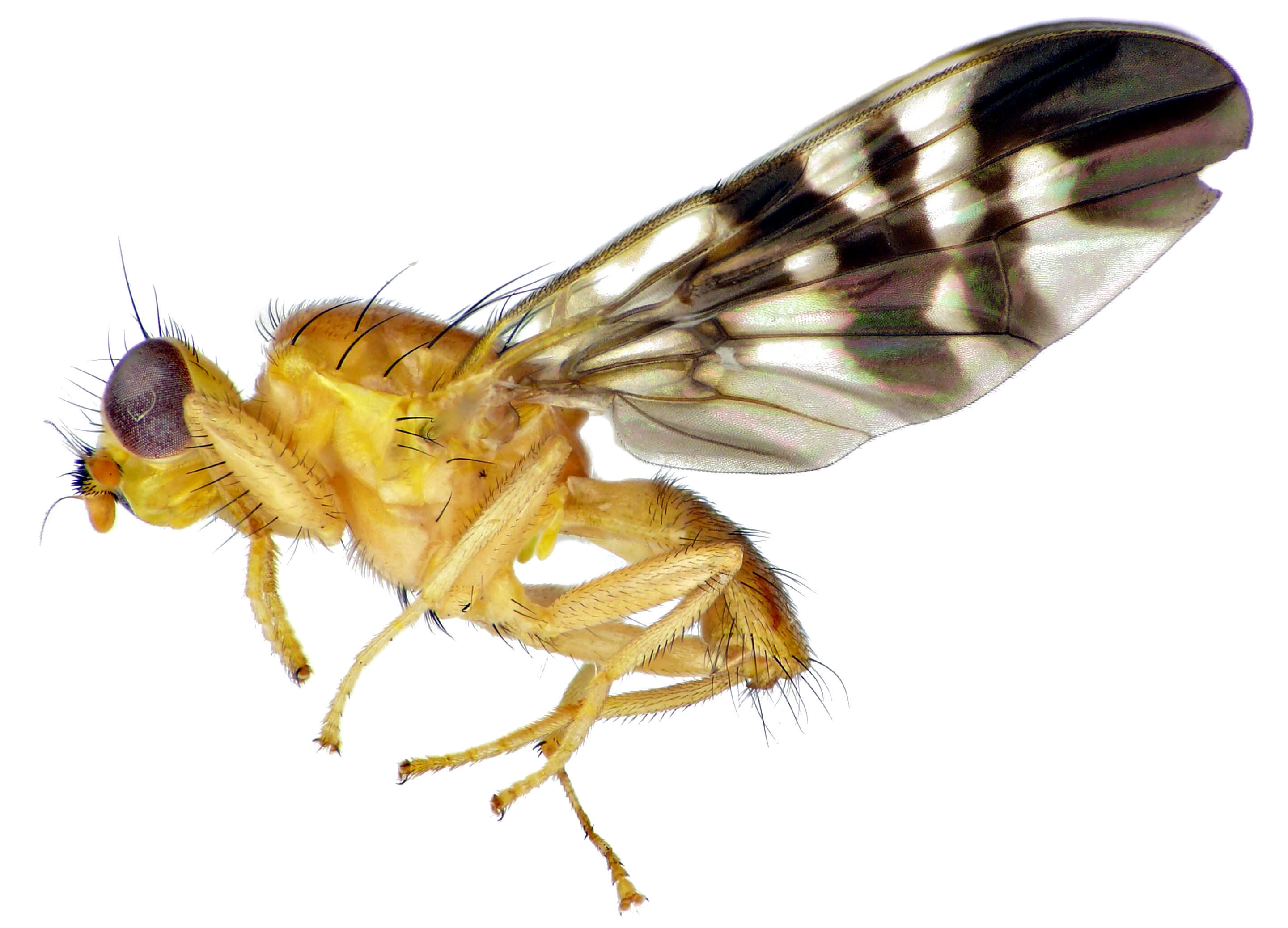
- Aischrocrania multipilosa (Kwon, 1985)

Scientific classification
- Kingdom: Animalia
- Phylum: Arthropoda
- Class: Insecta
- Order: Diptera
- Family: Tephritidae
- Subfamily: Trypetinae
- Genus: Aischrocrania; Hendel, 1927

Type species
- Aischrocrania aldrichi Hendel, 1927

Synonyms
- Kwasilparia Kwon, 1985; Moritsugia Shiraki, 1933; Neomyoleja Tseng, Chu & Chen, 1992

= Aischrocrania =

Genus of flies

Aischrocrania is a genus of tephritid or fruit flies in the family Tephritidae.

It has a body length of 5 mm (0.20 in) and a wingspan of 5.5 mm (0.22 in). The head is tan. The forehead is slightly wider than the width of the eyes and becomes narrower towards the bottom. It has fine brown hair. Antennae reach the front of the mouth margin, and the third antennal segment is brown and 1.8 times longer than the width. The chest is tan. The wings are transparent and have dark brown patterns. The thorax is dark brown. The abdomen is yellowish-brown, the basal segment of the ovipositor is dark brown, and there is a central brown stripe on the back. It is distributed in the south-central part of Korea and is endemic to Korea.

== Aischrocrania species ==
- Aischrocrania aldrichi (Hendel, 1927)
- Aischrocrania brevimedia (Wang, 1992)
- Aischrocrania chowi (Tseng, Chu, & Chen, 1992)
- Aischrocrania jucunda (Ito, 1956)
- Aischrocrania multipilosa (Kwon, 1985)
- Aischrocrania prima (Richter & Kandybina, 1981)
- Aischrocrania quadrimaculata (Shiraki, 1933)
- Aischrocrania quadrisetata (Hering, 1938)
