= Parastenopa =

Scientific classification
- Domain: Eukaryota
- Kingdom: Animalia
- Phylum: Arthropoda
- Class: Insecta
- Order: Diptera
- Family: Tephritidae
- Subtribe: Chetostomatina
- Genus: Parastenopa; Hendel, 1914

Synonyms
- Hamouchaeta Blanchard, 1929; Kartabia Blanchard, 1929; Mesaraelia Curran, 1934; Pseudeuleia Hering, 1940

Genus of flies

Parastenopa is a genus of fruit flies in the family Tephritidae. There are about 10 described species in Parastenopa.

== Species ==
These 10 species belong to the genus Parastenopa:

- Parastenopa anastrephoides (Curran, 1934)^{i c g}
- Parastenopa brasiliensis (Lima, 1933)^{i c g}
- Parastenopa carinata Hendel, 1914^{i c g}
- Parastenopa elegans (Blanchard, 1929)^{i c g}
- Parastenopa fallax (Johnson, 1919)^{i c g}
- Parastenopa guttata Aczel, 1956^{i c g}
- Parastenopa limata (Coquillett, 1899)^{i c g b}
- Parastenopa marcetiae Bezzi & Tavares, 1916^{i c g}
- Parastenopa montana Aczel, 1956^{i c g}
- Parastenopa ogloblini (Blanchard, 1929)^{i c g}

Data sources: i = ITIS, c = Catalogue of Life, g = GBIF, b = Bugguide.net
