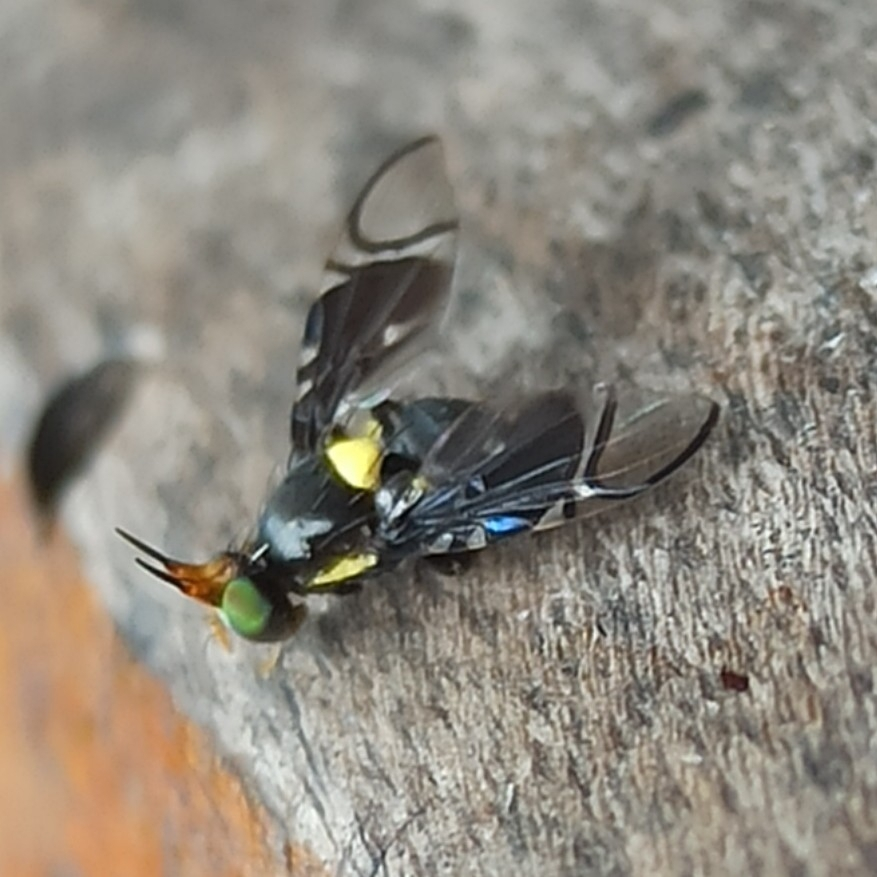
- Hoplandromyia antelopa

Scientific classification
- Domain: Eukaryota
- Kingdom: Animalia
- Phylum: Arthropoda
- Class: Insecta
- Order: Diptera
- Family: Tephritidae
- Genus: Hoplandromyia

= Hoplandromyia =

Genus of flies

Hoplandromyia is a genus of tephritid or fruit flies in the family Tephritidae.
