= Alincocallistomyia =

Scientific classification
- Domain: Eukaryota
- Kingdom: Animalia
- Phylum: Arthropoda
- Class: Insecta
- Order: Diptera
- Family: Tephritidae
- Genus: Alincocallistomyia; Hardy, 1986
- Species: A. imitator

Binomial name
- Alincocallistomyia imitator Hardy, 1986

Genus of flies

Alincocallistomyia is a genus of tephritid or fruit flies in the family Tephritidae. It is monotypic, being represented by the single species Alincocallistomyia imitator.
