= Pardalaspinus =

Scientific classification
- Kingdom: Animalia
- Phylum: Arthropoda
- Class: Insecta
- Order: Diptera
- Family: Tephritidae
- Subfamily: Tephritinae
- Genus: Pardalaspinus; Hering, 1952

Synonyms
- Ceratitisoma Zia, 1964; Notophosa Zia, 1964

Genus of flies

Pardalaspinus is a genus of tephritid or fruit flies in the family Tephritidae.
