= Paratrypeta =

Scientific classification
- Domain: Eukaryota
- Kingdom: Animalia
- Phylum: Arthropoda
- Class: Insecta
- Order: Diptera
- Family: Tephritidae
- Genus: Paratrypeta; Han & Wang, 1994

Species
- Paratrypeta appendiculata (Hendel, 1927); Paratrypeta flavoscutata Han & Wang, 1994

Genus of flies

Paratrypeta is a genus of fruit flies in the family Tephritidae, from China.
