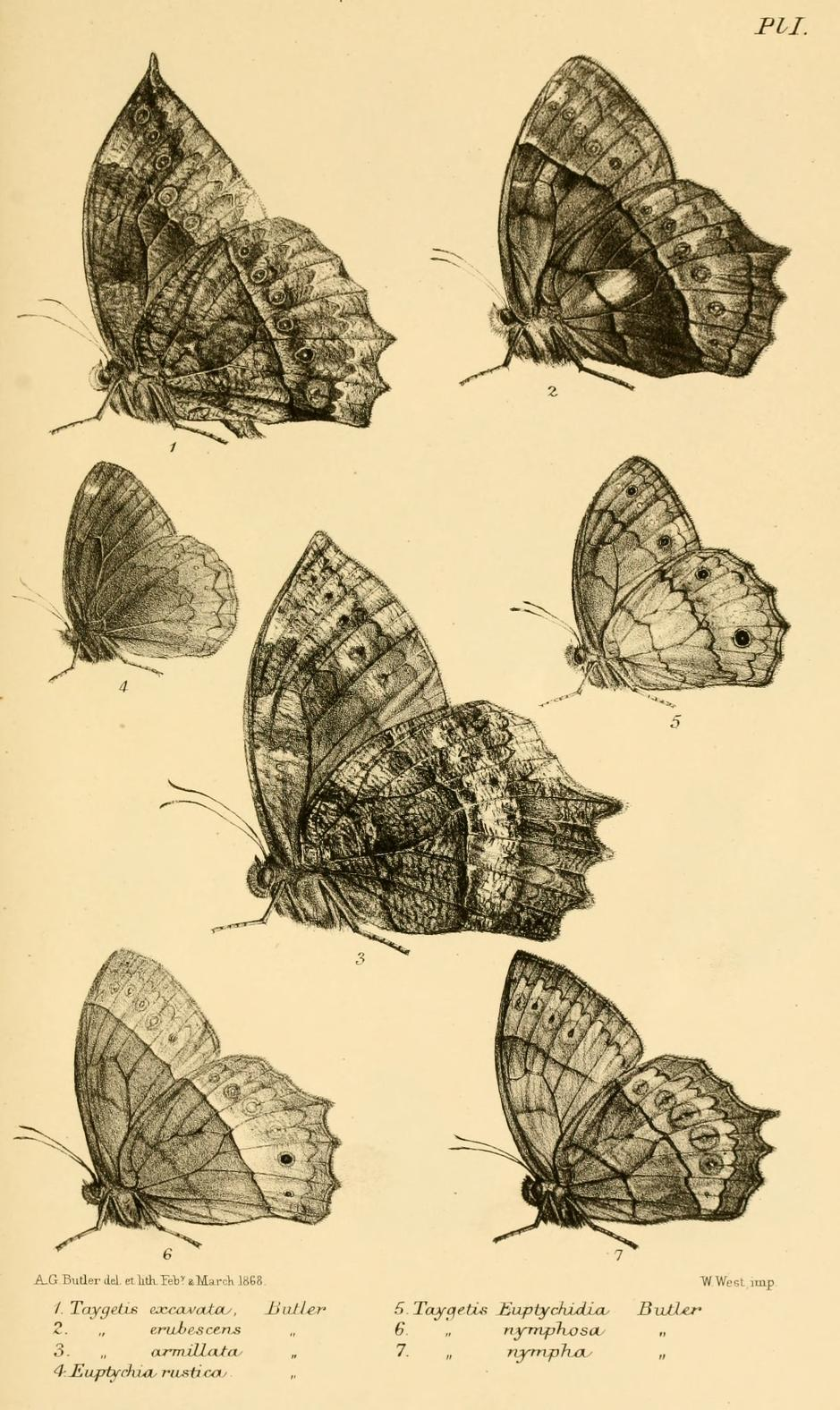
- Forsterinaria rustica and related species

Scientific classification
- Kingdom: Animalia
- Phylum: Arthropoda
- Class: Insecta
- Order: Lepidoptera
- Family: Nymphalidae
- Subfamily: Satyrinae
- Tribe: Satyrini
- Subtribe: Euptychiina
- Genus: Forsterinaria; Gray, 1973

Synonyms
- Haywardina Forster, 1964 (preocc.); Guaianaza Freitas & Peña, 2006

= Forsterinaria =

Genus of butterflies

Forsterinaria is a genus of satyrid butterflies found in the Neotropical realm.

== Species ==
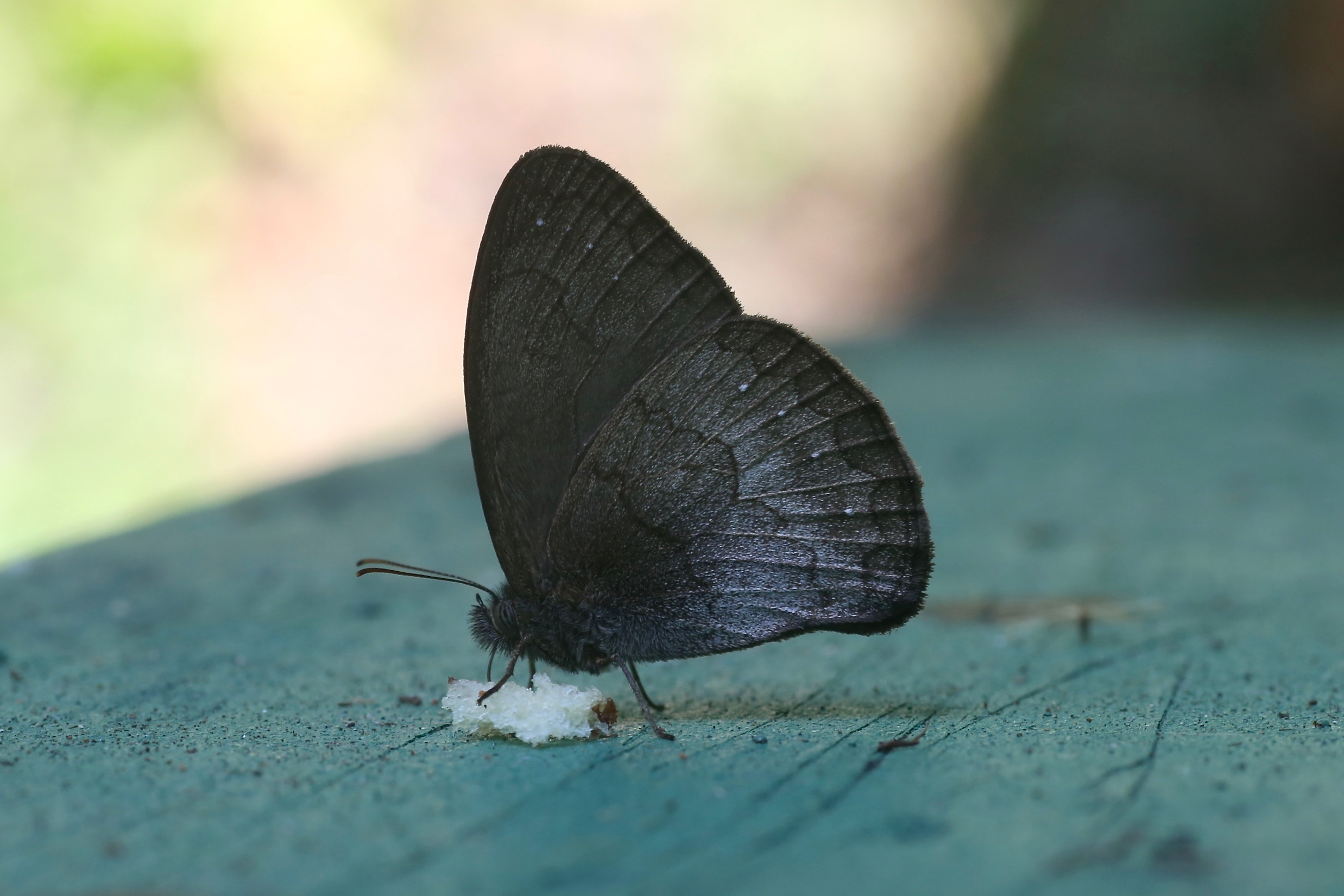
Forsterinaria pallida aurita, Ecuador, Mindo

Listed alphabetically:

- The neonympha species group
  - Forsterinaria neonympha (C. & R. Felder, [1867]) – white-dotted ringlet
  - Forsterinaria proxima (Hayward, 1957)
  - Forsterinaria pyrczi Peña & Lamas, 2005
  - Forsterinaria stella (Hayward, 1957)
- The pichita species group
  - Forsterinaria antje Peña & Lamas, 2005
  - Forsterinaria difficilis (Forster, 1964)
  - Forsterinaria emo Zubek, Pyrcz & Boyer, 2013
  - Forsterinaria falcata Peña & Lamas, 2005
  - Forsterinaria guaniloi Peña & Lamas, 2005
  - Forsterinaria pichita Peña & Lamas, 2005
  - Forsterinaria pilosa Peña & Lamas, 2005
  - Forsterinaria rotunda Peña & Lamas, 2005
  - Forsterinaria rustica (Butler, 1868)
- The boliviana species group
  - Forsterinaria boliviana (Godman, 1905)
  - Forsterinaria coipa Peña & Lamas, 2005
  - Forsterinaria hannieri Zubek & Pyrcz, 2011
  - Forsterinaria inornata (C. & R. Felder, [1867]) – plain ringlet
  - Forsterinaria pallida Peña & Lamas, 2005 – pallid ringlet
- The enjuerma species group
  - Forsterinaria anophthalma (C. & R. Felder, [1867])
  - Forsterinaria enjuerma Peña & Lamas, 2005
  - Forsterinaria pseudinornata (Forster, 1964)
  - Forsterinaria punctata Peña & Lamas, 2005
- The brasilian species group
  - Forsterinaria itatiaia Peña & Lamas, 2005
  - Forsterinaria necys (Godart, [1824])
  - Forsterinaria quantius (Godart, [1824])
