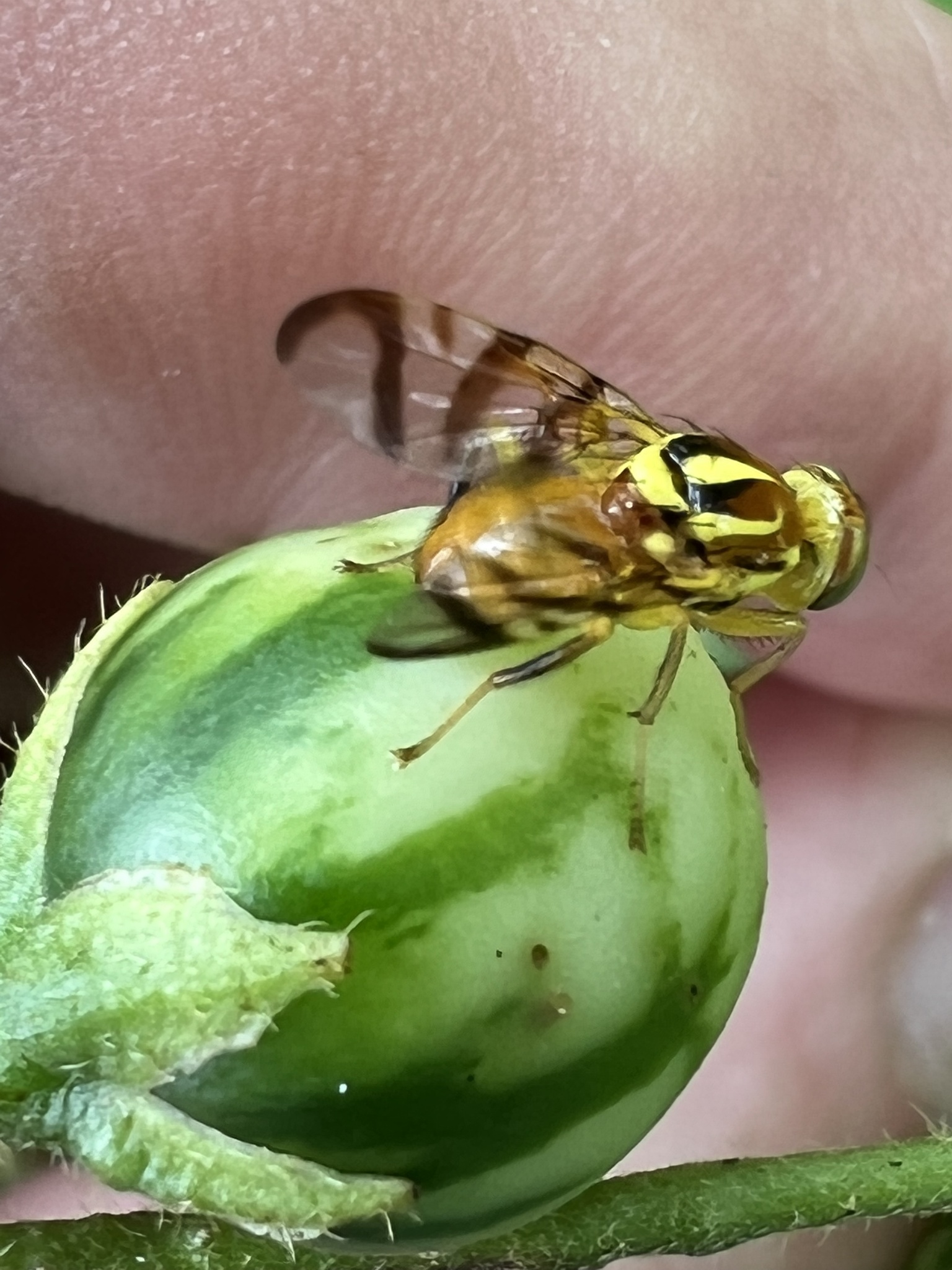
- Zonosemata electa, Virginia

Scientific classification
- Domain: Eukaryota
- Kingdom: Animalia
- Phylum: Arthropoda
- Class: Insecta
- Order: Diptera
- Family: Tephritidae
- Tribe: Carpomyini
- Subtribe: Carpomyina
- Genus: Zonosemata; Benjamin, 1934

= Zonosemata =

Genus of flies

Zonosemata is a genus of tephritid or fruit flies in the family Tephritidae, comprising six species from North America and one from South America. The species are as follows:

- Zonosemata cocoyoc Bush, 1965
- Zonosemata electa (Say, 1830)
- Zonosemata macgregori Hernandez-Ortiz, 1989
- Zonosemata minuta Bush, 1965
- Zonosemata scutellata (Hendel, 1936)
- Zonosemata vidrapennis Bush, 1965
- Zonosemata vittigera (Coquillett, 1899)
