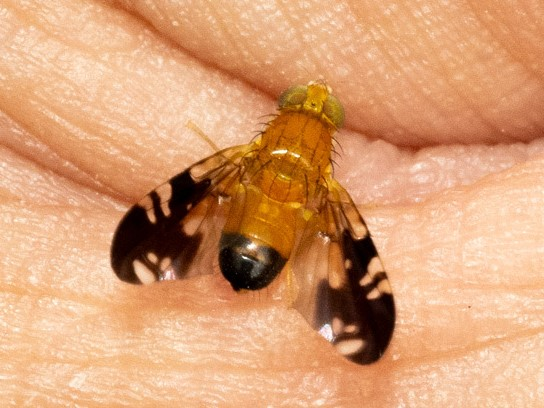
- Acidiella caudata

Scientific classification
- Domain: Eukaryota
- Kingdom: Animalia
- Phylum: Arthropoda
- Class: Insecta
- Order: Diptera
- Family: Tephritidae
- Subfamily: Trypetinae
- Tribe: Trypetini
- Subtribe: Trypetina
- Genus: Acidiella; Hendel, 1914

Species
- See text

Synonyms
- Ihekaze Ito, 1956; Longiusculala Ito, 1984; Matsumuracidia Ito, 1949; Pogonangelus Ito, 1984; Pseudacidia Shiraki, 1933; Sineuleia Chen, 1948; Tetramyiolia Shiraki, 1933

= Acidiella (fly) =

Genus of flies

Acidiella is a genus of tephritid or fruit flies in the family Tephritidae.

== Species ==
Species accepted within Acidiella include:

- Acidiella abdominalis (Zia, 1938)
- Acidiella ambigua (Shiraki, 1933)
- Acidiella angustifrons (Hendel, 1927)
- Acidiella arisanica Shiraki, 1933
- Acidiella bimaculata (Hardy, 1987)
- Acidiella circumvaga (Ito, 1984)
- Acidiella consobrina (Zia, 1937)
- Acidiella contraria (Walker, 1853)
- Acidiella dilutata (Ito, 1984)
- Acidiella disjuncta (Ito, 1953)
- Acidiella diversa Ito, 1952
- Acidiella formosana (Shiraki, 1933)
- Acidiella funesta (Hering, 1938)
- Acidiella fuscibasis Hering, 1953
- Acidiella issikii (Shiraki, 1933)
- Acidiella japonica (Hendel, 1927)
- Acidiella kagoshimensis (Miyake, 1919)
- Acidiella lineata (Shiraki, 1933)
- Acidiella longipennis Hendel, 1914
- Acidiella maculata (Shiraki, 1933)
- Acidiella maculinotum (Hering, 1938)
- Acidiella maculipennis (Hendel, 1927)
- Acidiella malaisei (Hering, 1938)
- Acidiella pachypogon (Ito, 1984)
- Acidiella persimilis Hendel, 1915
- Acidiella pseudolineata (Hering, 1938)
- Acidiella rectangularis (Munro, 1935)
- Acidiella retroflexa (Wang, 1990)
- Acidiella rioxaeformis (Bezzi, 1913)
- Acidiella sapporensis (Shiraki, 1933)
- Acidiella scelesta (Hering, 1938)
- Acidiella sepulcralis Hering, 1938
- Acidiella spinifera (Hering, 1938)
- Acidiella trigenata (Munro, 1938)
- Acidiella turgida (Hering, 1939)
- Acidiella yasumatsui (Ito, 1949)
