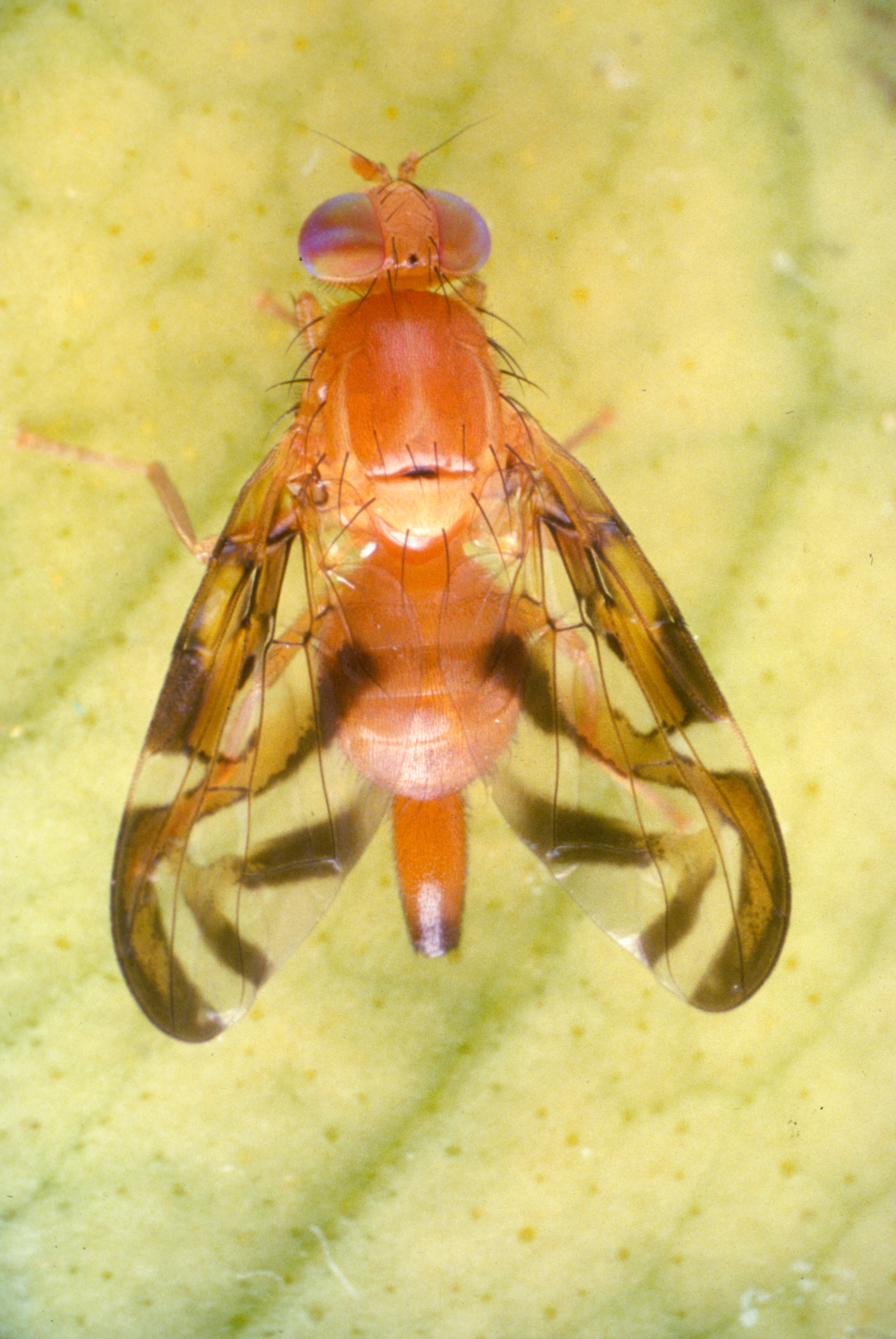
- Anastrepha suspensa

Scientific classification
- Kingdom: Animalia
- Phylum: Arthropoda
- Class: Insecta
- Order: Diptera
- Family: Tephritidae
- Subfamily: Trypetinae
- Tribe: Toxotrypanini
- Genus: Anastrepha; Schiner, 1868

Synonyms
- Anastrepha Schiner, 1868; Toxotrypana Gerstaecker, 1860; Acrotoxa Loew, 1873; Mikimyia Bigot, 1884; Pseudodacus Hendel, 1914a; Pseudodacus Hendel, 1914b; Phobema Aldrich, 1925; Lucumaphila Stone, 1939

= Anastrepha =

Genus of flies

Anastrepha is the most diverse genus of tephritid fruit flies in the American tropics and subtropics. Currently, it comprises more than 300 described species, including nine major pest species, such as the Mexican fruit fly (A. ludens), the South American fruit fly (A. fraterculus complex), the West Indian fruit fly (A. obliqua), the sapote fruit fly (A. serpentina), the Caribbean fruit fly (A. suspensa), the American guava fruit fly (A. striata), and the pumpkin fruit fly (A. grandis), as well as the papaya fruit fly (formerly Toxotrypana curvicada). As some of their names suggest, these pest species are one of the most numerous and damaging groups of insects in their native range, plaguing commercial fruits such as citrus, mango, guava, and papaya.

== Biology and ecology ==
=== Natural history and life cycle ===
Females lay their eggs in either developing and healthy fruits or in mature and rotten fruit (like the A. suspensa). The vast majority of species use their ovipositor to deposit the eggs in the edible part of the fruit (either the epicarp or mesocarp), and some species such as A. hamata and A. intermedia lay the eggs in the seed. Eggs can be laid in one or a group of eggs per oviposition, and it could vary among species. After the egg hatches inside the fruit, larvae complete three larval instars. Once larvae are fully mature make a hole to come out of the fruit, and it most happen when the fruit is on the ground. Then, the larva makes a hole on the ground to become a pupa. The life cycle begin again when the female emerge and become mature to produce eggs by feeding on sources of carbohydrate and protein. The life cycle (egg to adult) of Anastrepha ludens takes 27 days or longer if the temperature is lower than 30 °C.

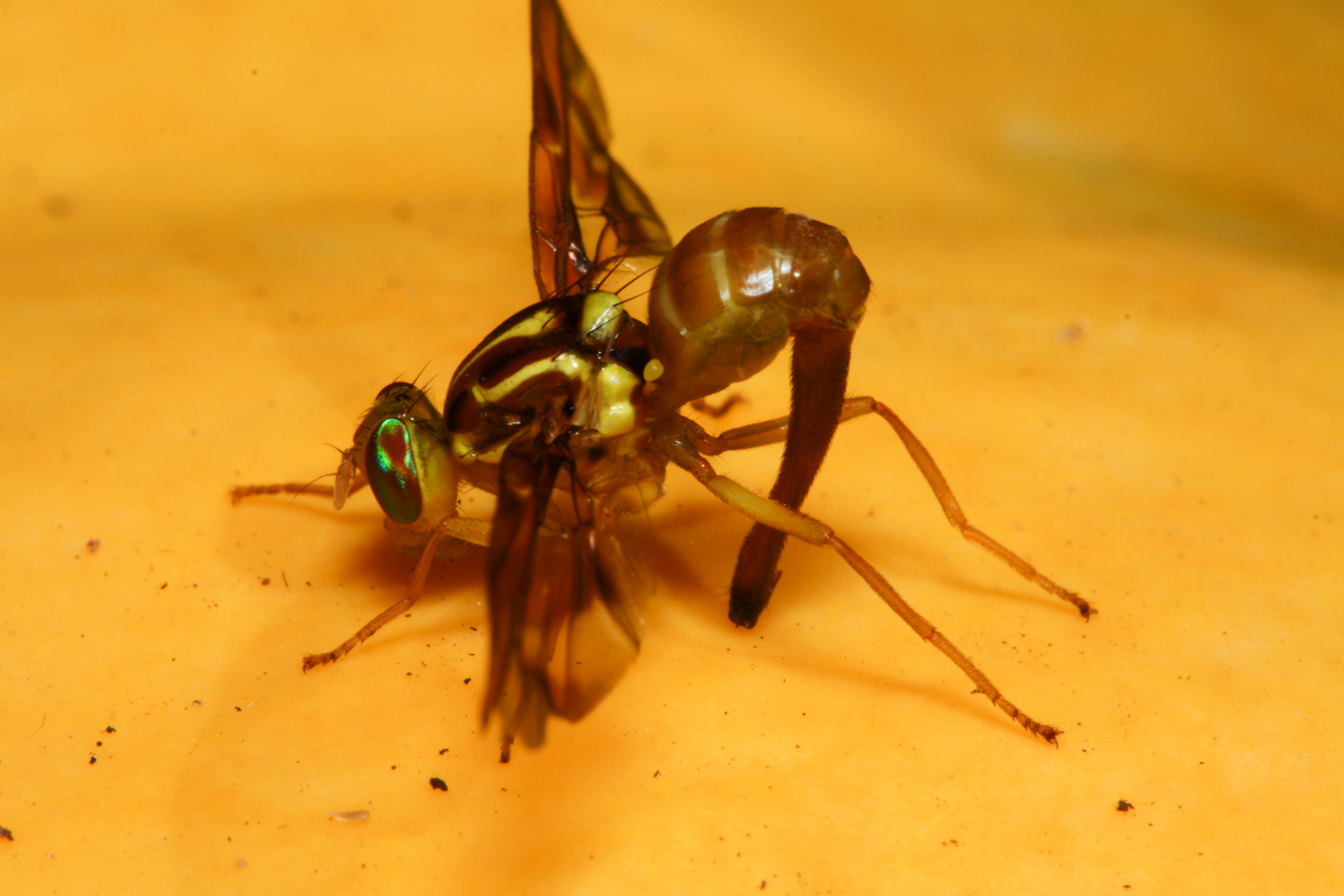
Female of Anastrepha grandis laying eggs on the fruit.

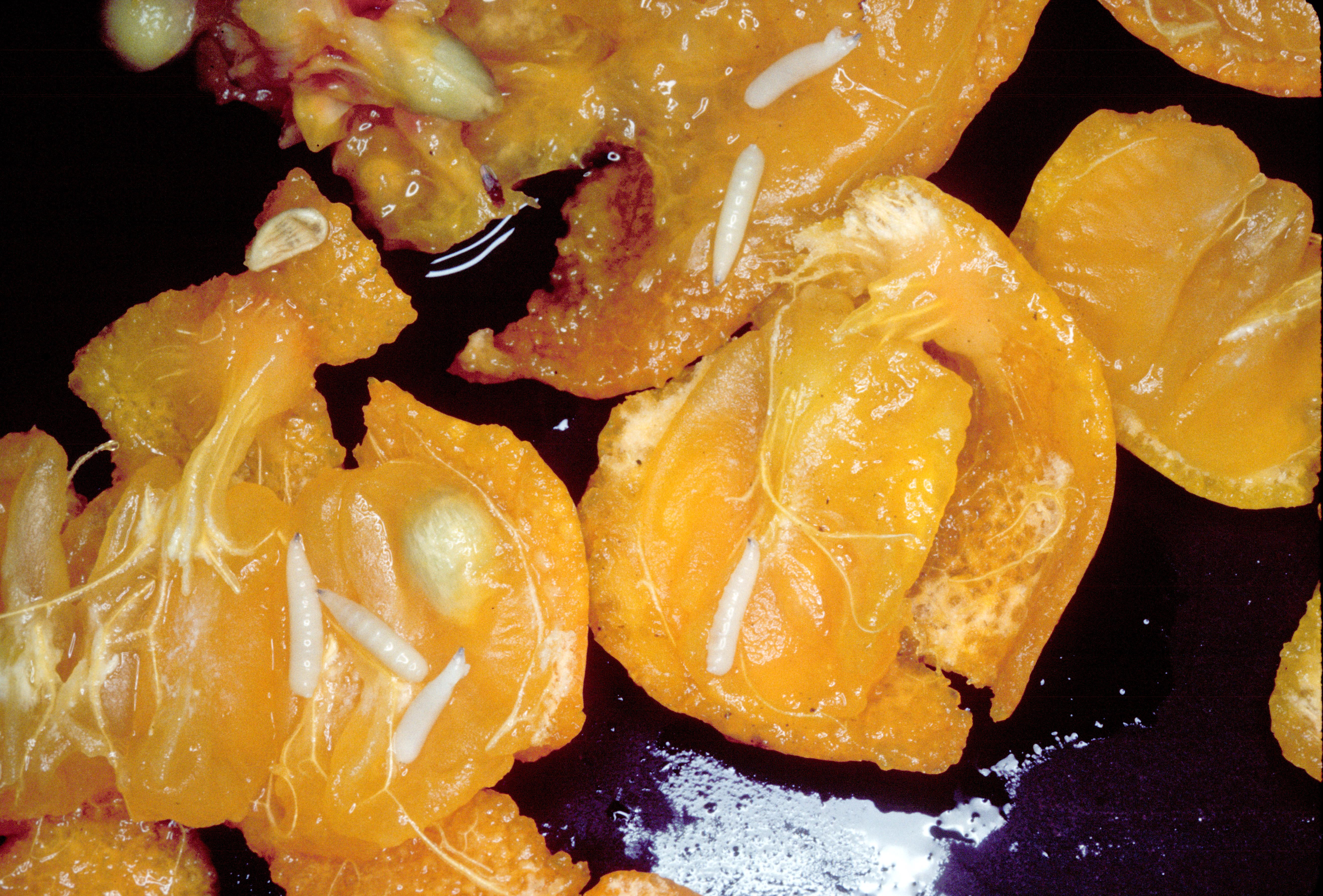
Infested fruit with larvae of Anastrepha suspensa.

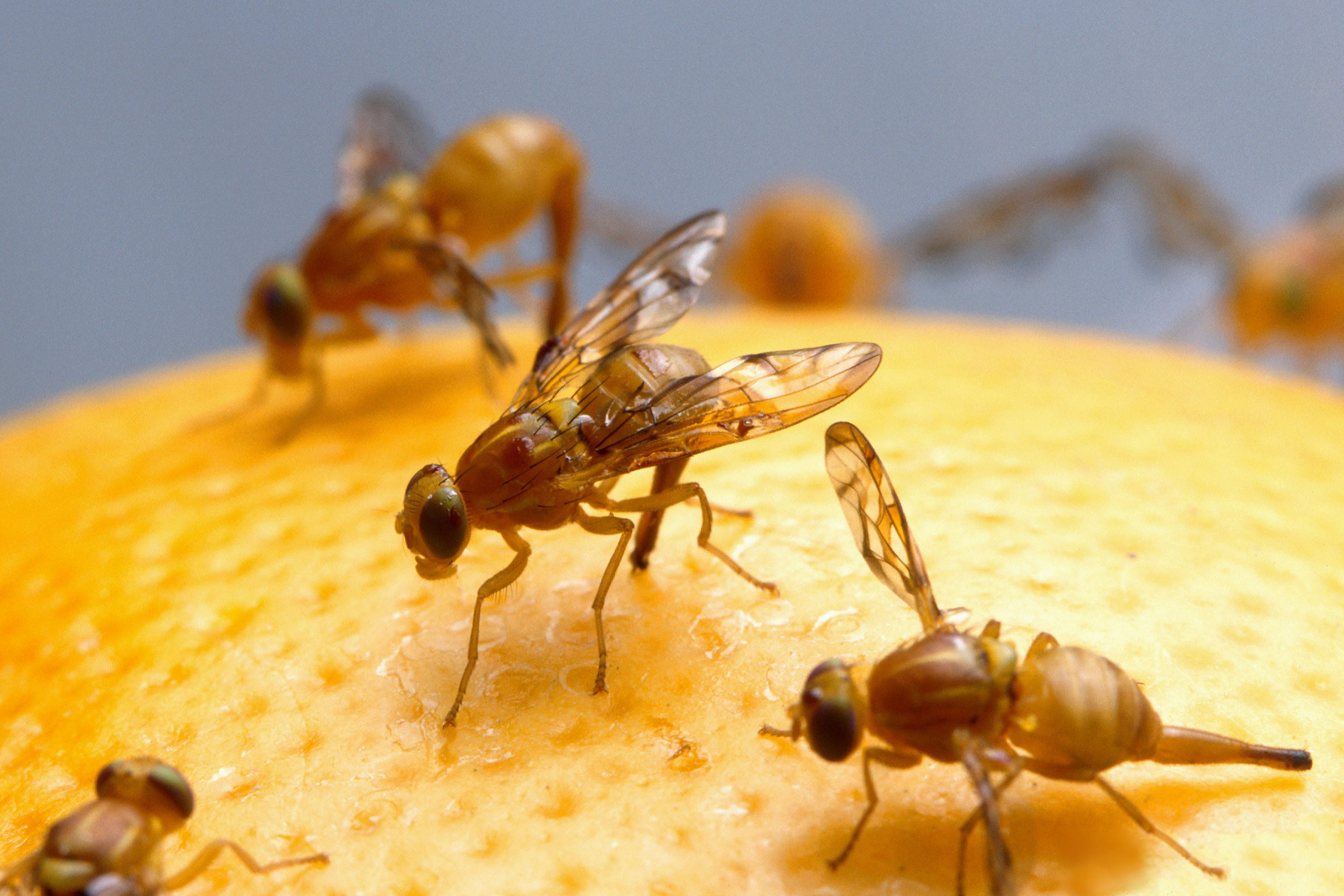
Females of Anastrepha ludens looking for sites to lay eggs, and ovipositor insertion to lay eggs.

Natural enemies are mainly in the families Braconidae and Ichneumonidae (Hymenoptera). Diachasmimorpha longicaudata and Doryctobracon crawfordi are established in the Americas, including the United States, Mexico, Colombia, Costa Rica, Guatemala, El Salvador, Nicaragua, Panama, and Brazil. These species has been released as an agent of biological control of pest species, such as A. ludens, A. obliqua, A. suspensa.

=== Host plants ===
Larvae attack plants in the families Sapotaceae, Moraceae, Malvaceae, Myrtaceae, Passifloraceae, Anacardiaceae, and Rutaceae. Larvae feed on the pulp or on the seeds. Host plant information for the major pest species is available online in the Compendium of Fruit Fly Host Information (https://coffhi.cphst.org/).

=== Gradient of altitude and habitat ===
Species of this genus are found across a wide range of altitude and habitats. The gradient of altitude has been documented from 0 - 2.600 m above sea level, but the highest diversity is found below 1,000 m. One extreme exception is the morphotype Brazil 1 in the Anastrepha fraterculus complex that attacks peach, apple, cherry and other host in a dry, temperate and high valley system (Valle Sagrado de los Incas, Cusco, Peru) at 2,600 m. Common pest species are abundant and found in crops, orchards, backyard trees, and rare species occur in secondary or primary forest, and edges or boundaries of patches of forest between 750–820 m. Anastrepha is mainly associated with tropical rainforests, but it is also found in subtropical regions such as southern of Florida. However, Anastrepha tehuacana was described and documented from the Mojave Desert in Puebla, Mexico, and it feeds on seeds of Euphorbia tehuacana.

== Taxonomy and systematics ==
=== Phylogenetics and taxonomy ===
Anastrepha is morphologically and molecularly classified in 23 species group. However, the most recent molecular phylogeny suggested to split the genus in 27 groups, including those species in the former genus Toxotrypana. Norrbom et al. proposed to synonymize Toxotrypana and keep the genus name Anastrepha because it comprises more pest species of agricultural importance. Also, they proposed nomenclature changes where all the seven originally described species in Toxotrypana are now under the genus Anastrepha as follows: Anastrepha australis (Blanchard 1960), Anastrepha curvicauda (Gerstaecker 1860), Anastrepha littoralis (Blanchard 1960), Anastrepha nigra (Blanchard 1960), Anastrepha picciola (Blanchard 1960), Anastrepha proseni (Blanchard 1960), Anastrepha recurcauda (Tigrero 1992). Additionally, a new name was assigned to the species previously known Anastrepha nigra Norrbom & Korytkowski, 2009 which is now Anastrepha nigrina Norrbom, 2018 because of priority rule.

=== Cryptic species ===
The Anastrepha fraterculus complex is still a mystery that remains unsolved. This began in 1942 when Stone observed morphological differences between populations from Central America and South America. Since then, adult and larvae morphology, molecular, isozyme, karyotype, host plants relationships, behavioral and mating compatibility have been studied. The conclusion from a group with multidisciplinary expertise is that Anastrepha fraterculus sensu latus comprises eight cryptic species (morphotypes) with a wide range of geographical distribution. One of them occur in Mexico and Central America (Mexican morphotype), and seven are found in South America (Colombia, Venezuela, Guianas, Brazil, Paraguay, Bolivia, Argentina, Peru, Ecuador); and four are recognizable and well documented morphotypes (Mexican, Andean, Peruvian and Brazil 1) which are distinguishable and represent biological species. Also, these cryptic species have a wide host plant range, and they attack 124 host plant species in 39 plant families. Thus, eight morphotypes are recognized, geographical distribution and host plant are better understood, but morphological and molecular techniques are still unreliable to identify specimens within this complex.

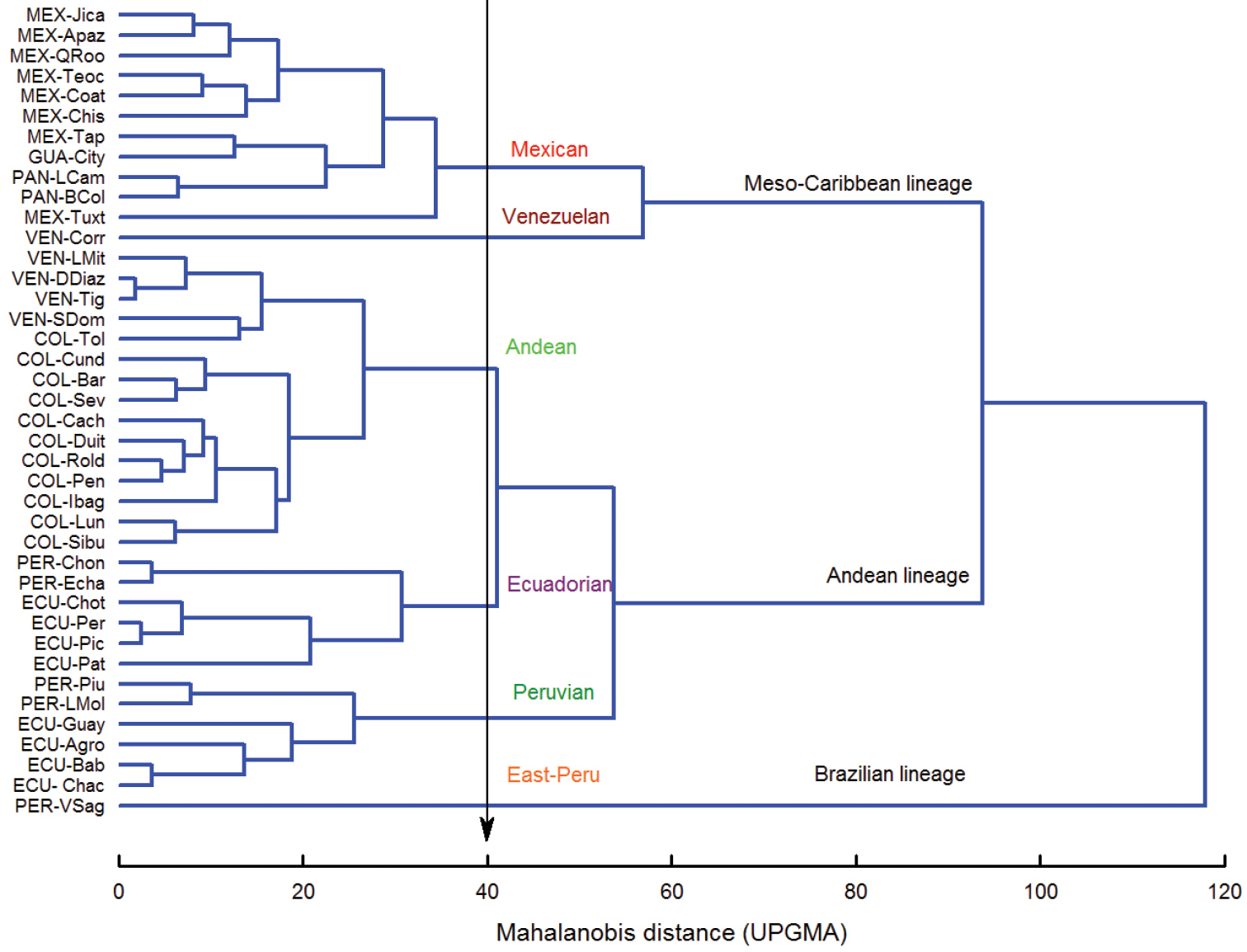
Major lineages within Anastrepha fraterculus complex. Taken from Hernandez-Ortiz et al. 2015.

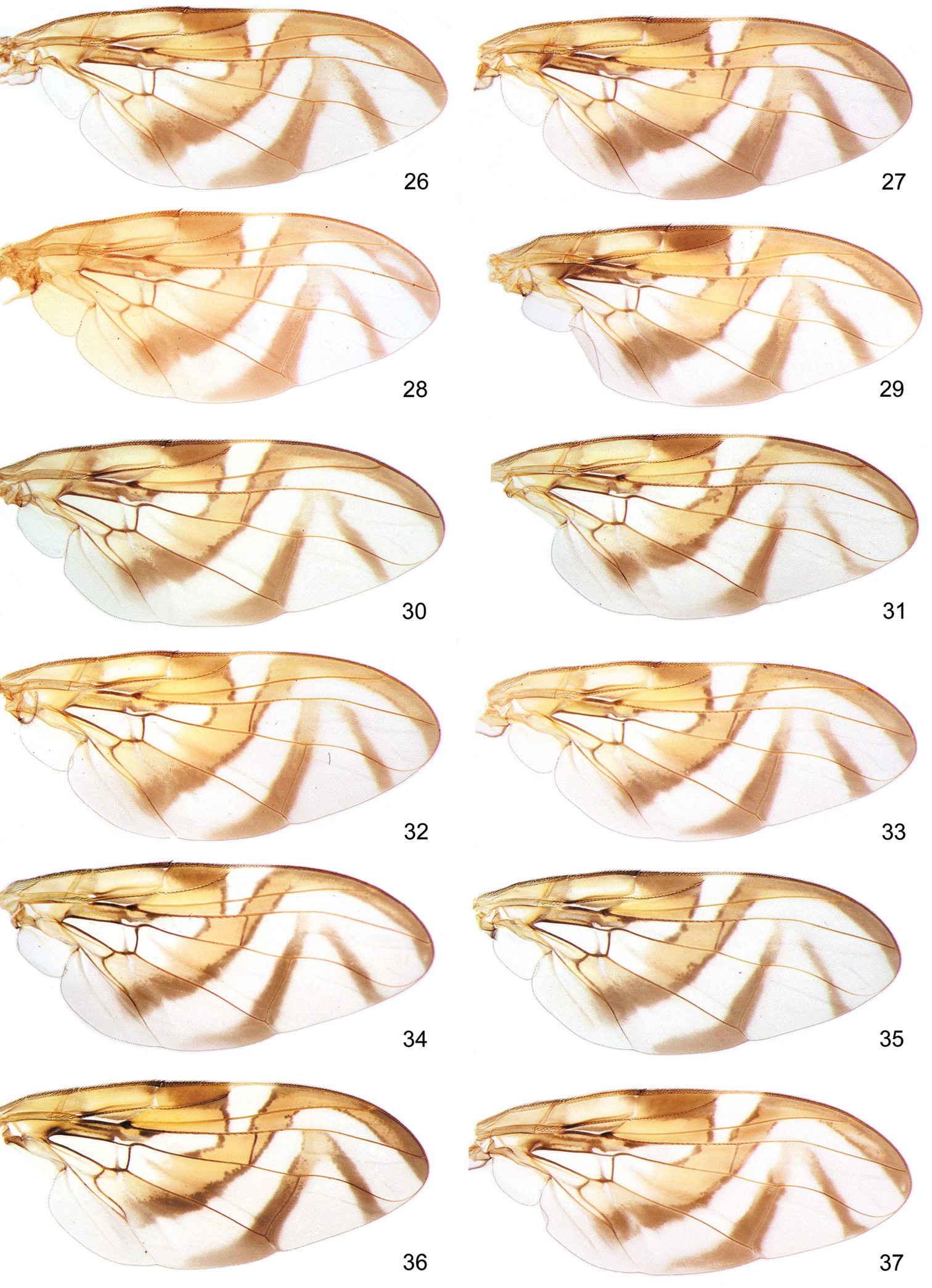
Wing patterns of major lineages within Anastrepha fraterculus complex. Taken from Hernandez-Ortiz et al. 2015.

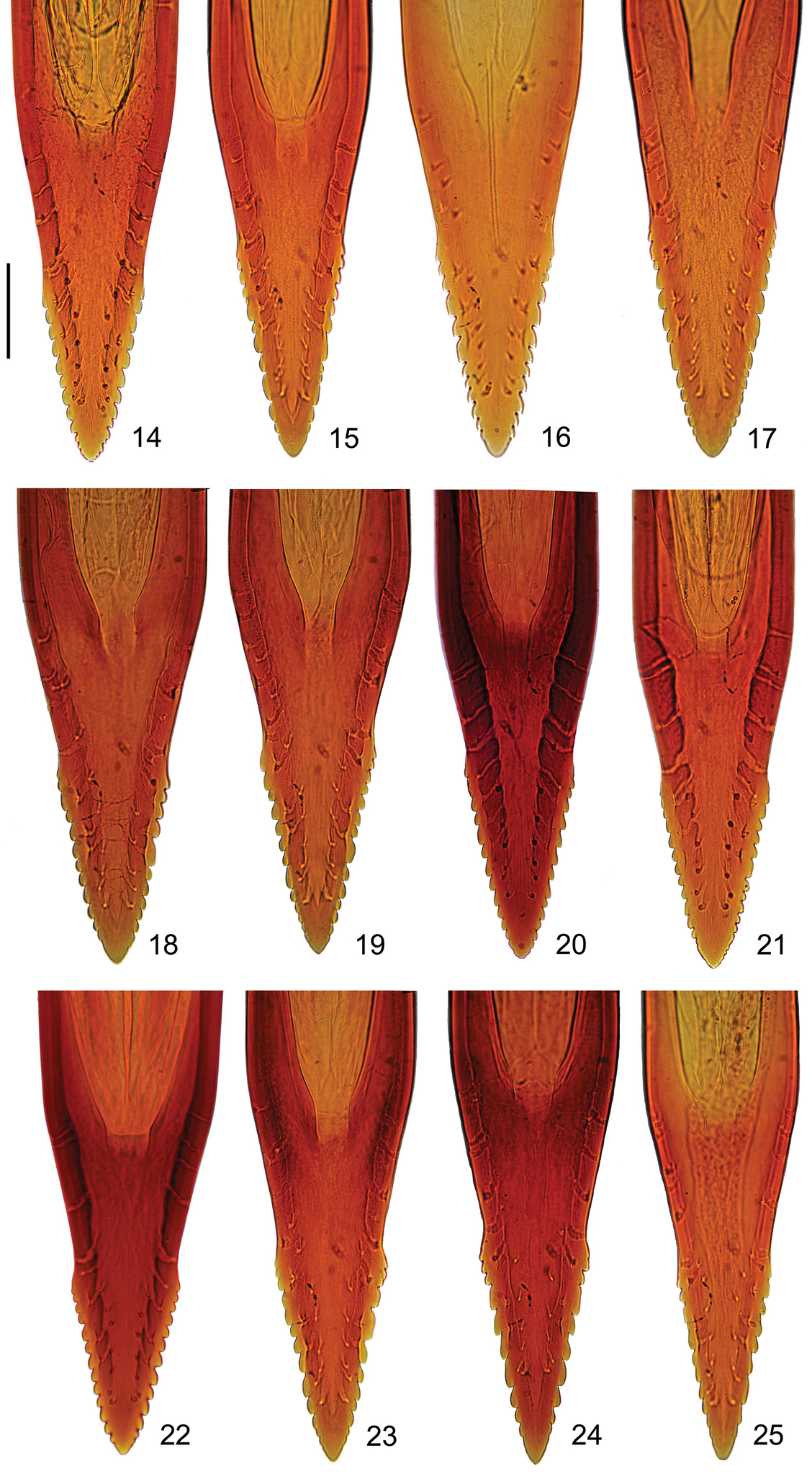
Aculeus tips of major lineages within Anastrepha fraterculus complex. Taken from Hernandez-Ortiz et al. 2015.

=== Larval morphology ===
The Immature stages of Anastrepha are poorly known. There are only 20 Anastrepha species with thorough description of eggs which include photomicroscopy. With regard to larval description, there are only 22 thorough description of the third instar-larval which represent less than 10% of the total number of described species to date. Ideally, a complete larval description should include a combination of drawings and imagery (using compound microscope and SEM) of the morphological structures such as antennal and maxillary sensory organ, oral ridges, Cephalopharyngeal skeleton (CPS), both dorsal and ventral spinules, and anterior and posterior spiracles.

In addition, larval morphology has not found characters with phylogenetic signal yet. One of the limitation has been acquiring the specimens from a broader range of geographical distribution, and larvae have been mostly described from one location (one country) or colony culture instead. Also, description of third-instar larval is only known from 11 species groups which are mostly represented by one or two Anastrepha species. Thirdly, feeding behavior (pulp or seed feeder) has not been very well documented and included as an evolutionary trait to enhance the phylogeny reconstruction. Thus, collection and description of immature stages of more species is badly needed to identify synapomorphies among the species group.

Morphological characters

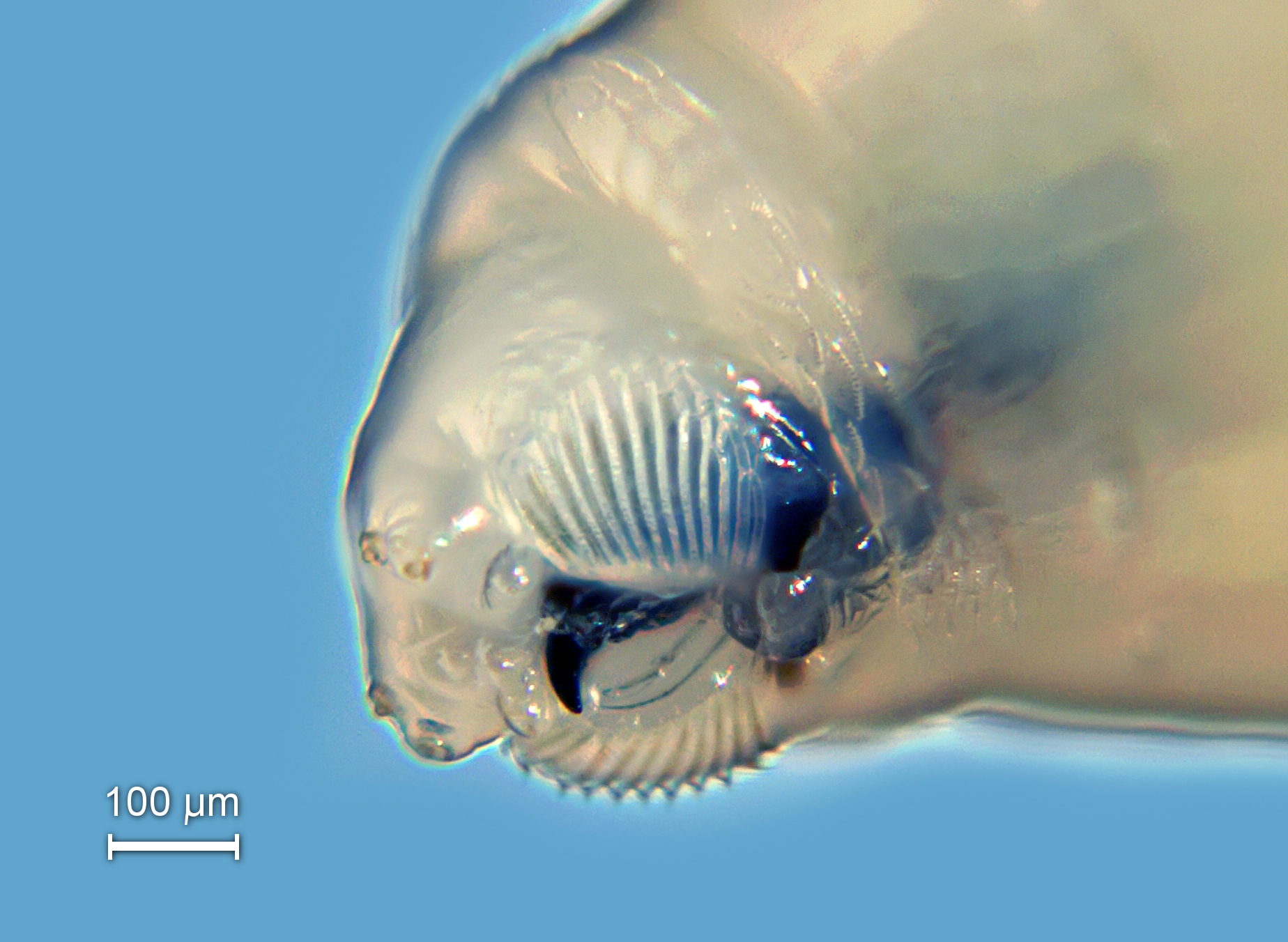
Head and face of Anastrepha ludens

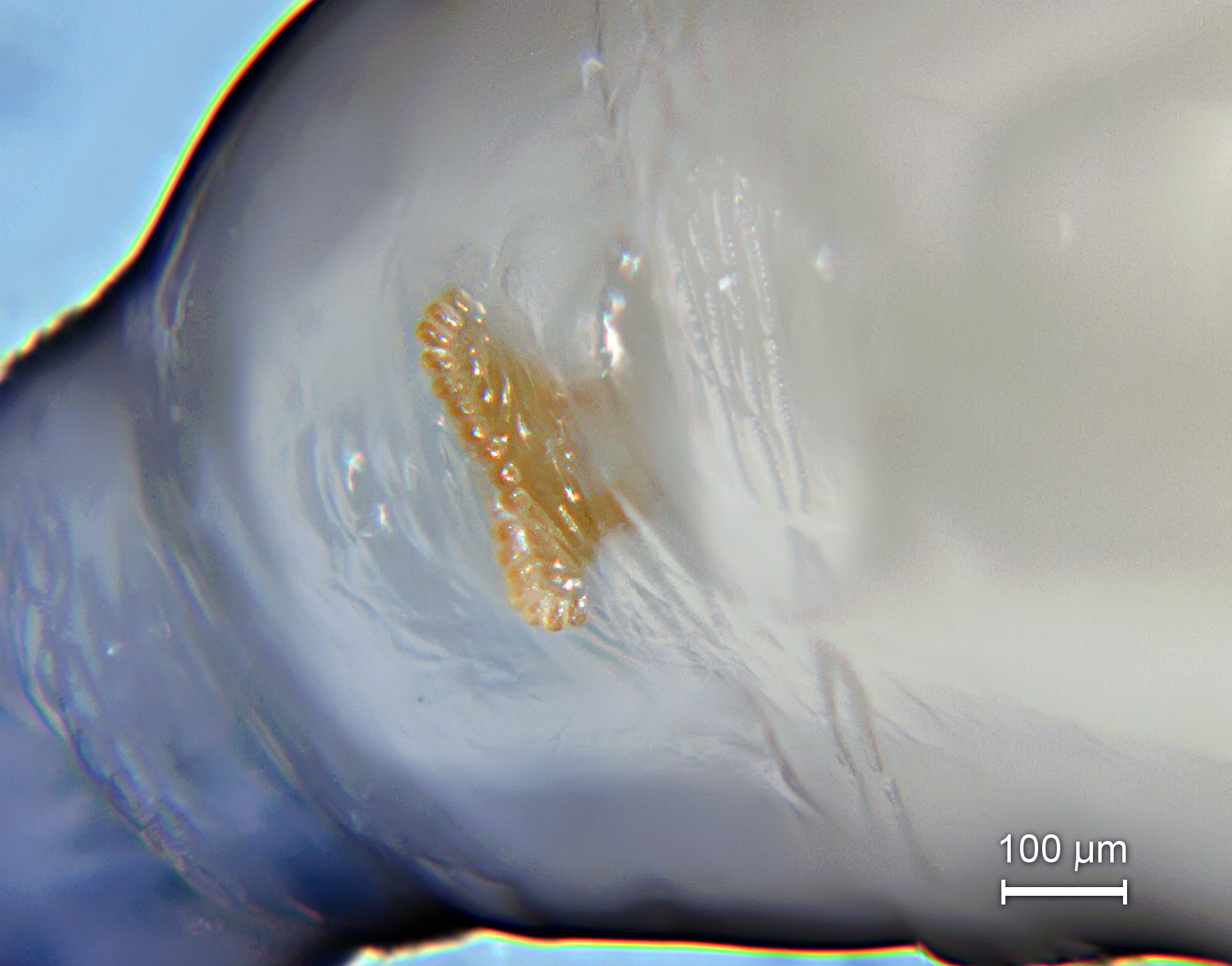
Anterior spiracles

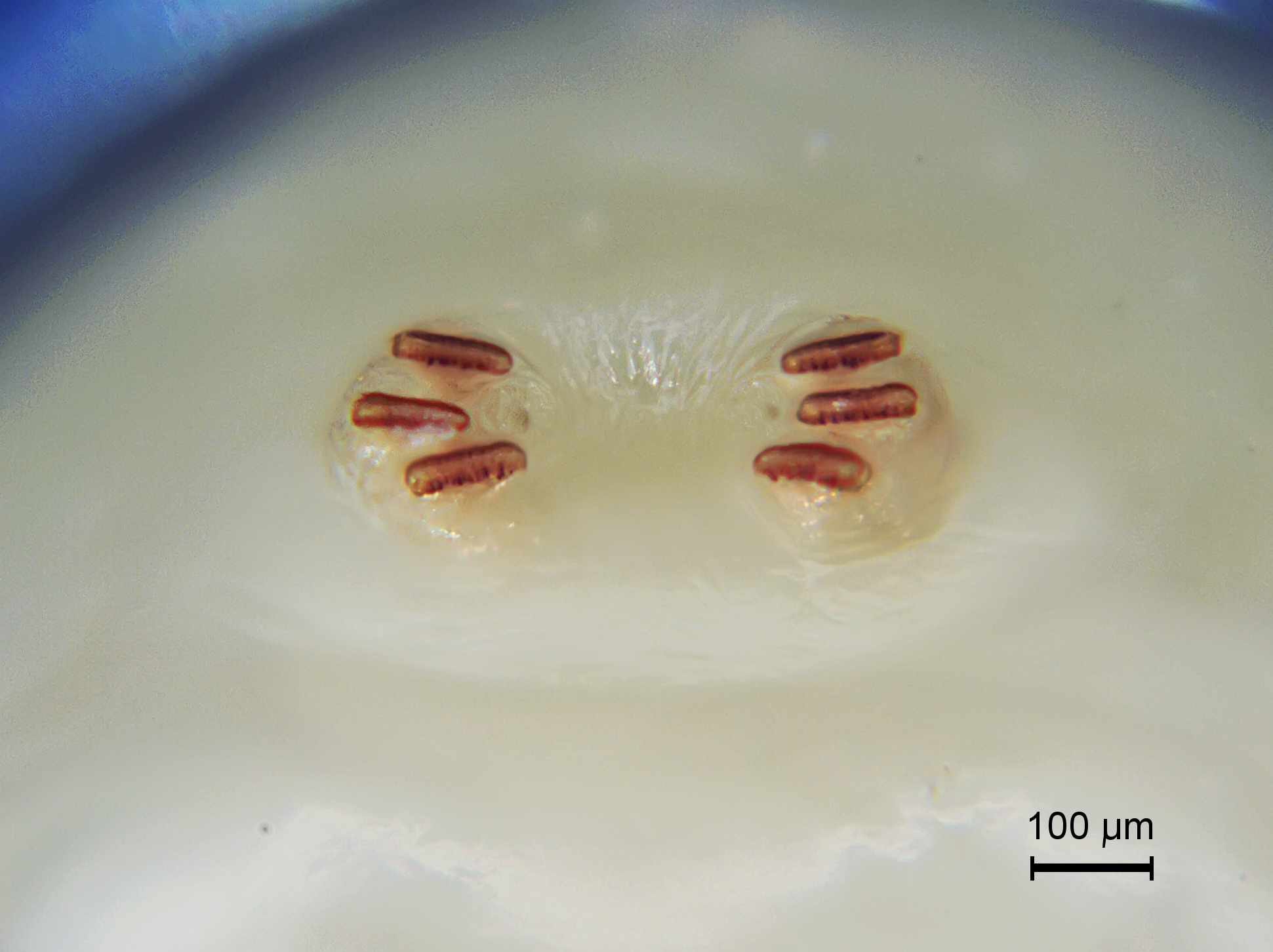
Posterior spiracles

Morphological characters

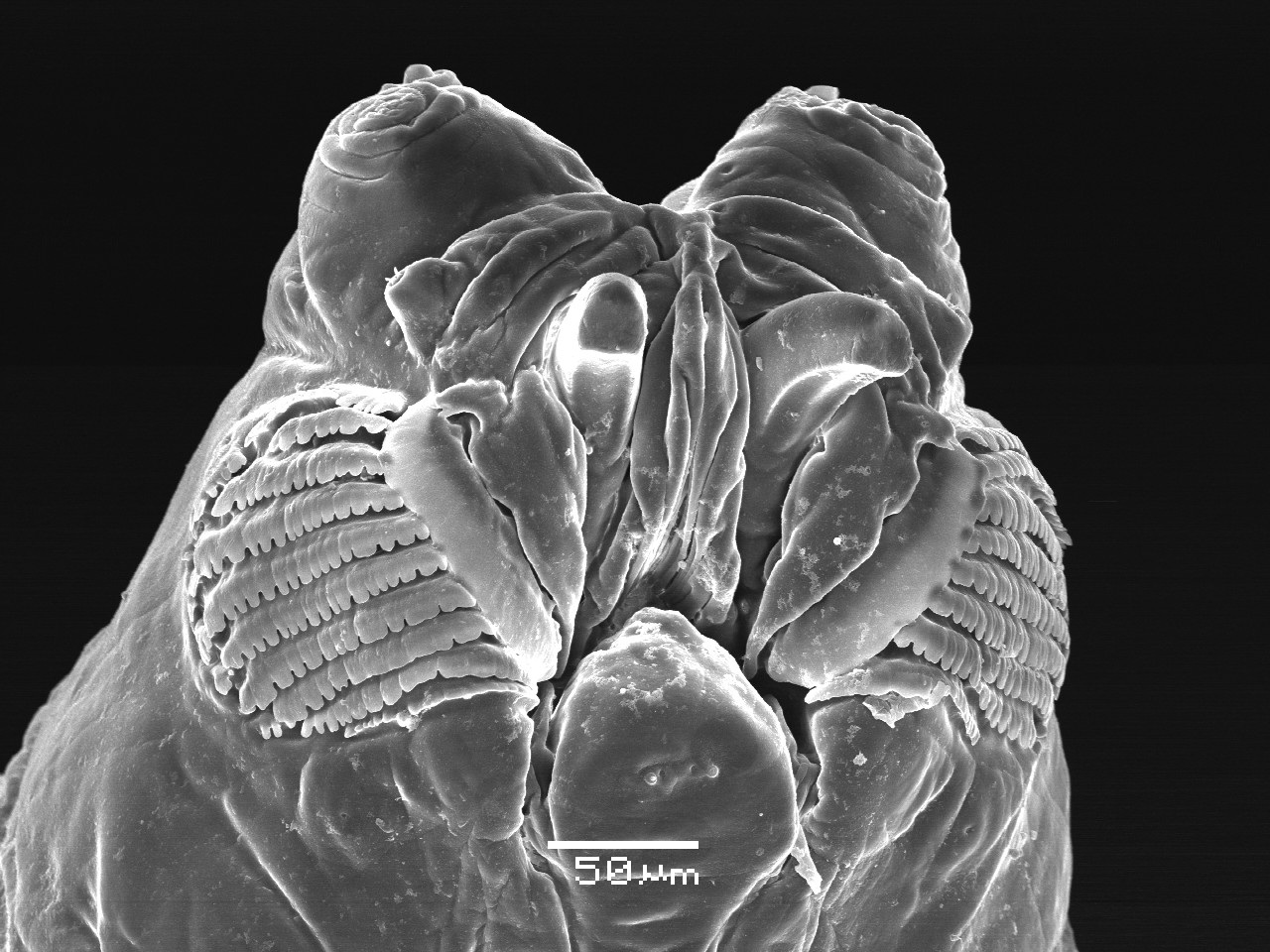
Head of Anastrepha suspensa

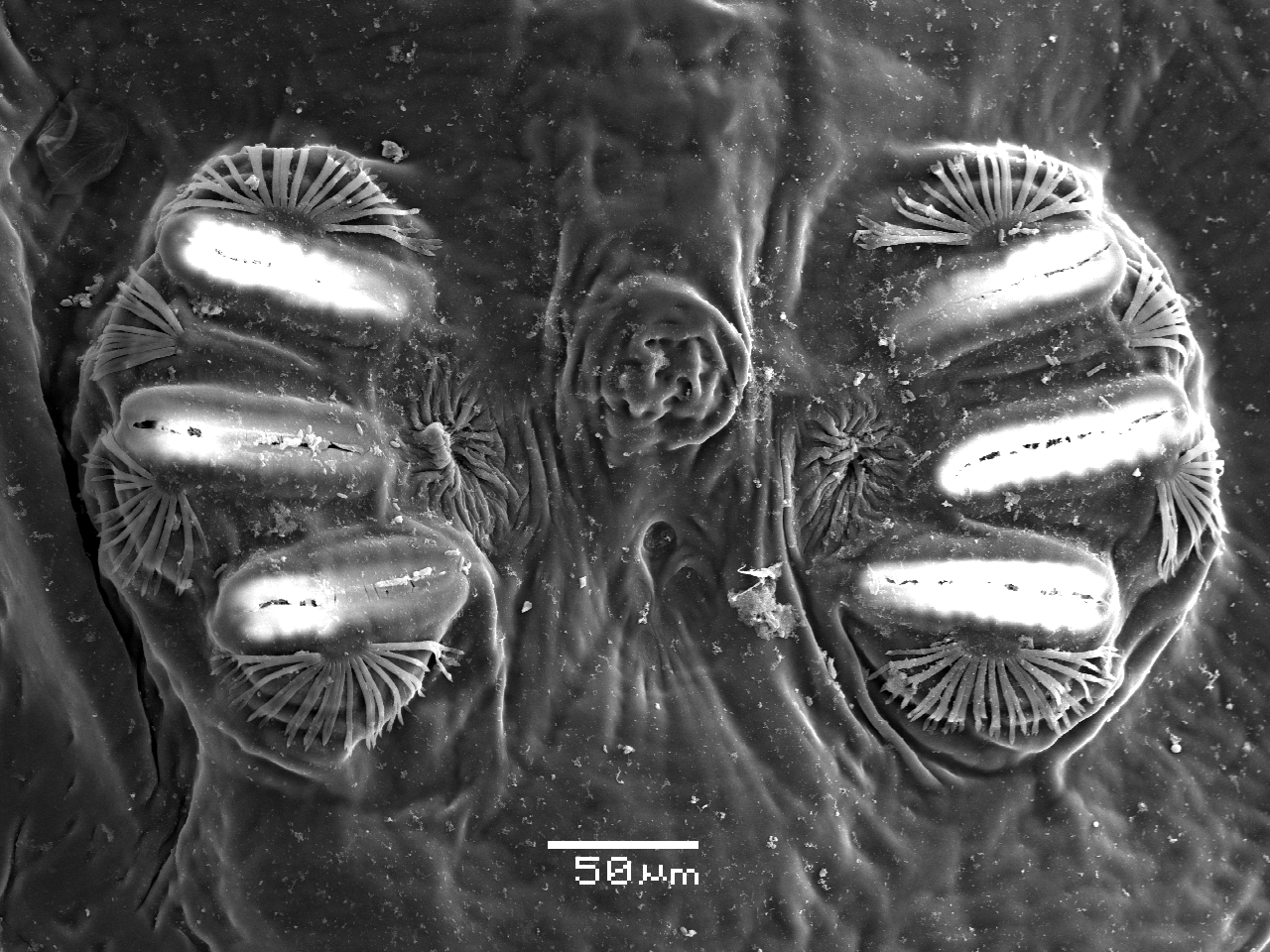
Posterior spiracles of Anastrepha suspensa

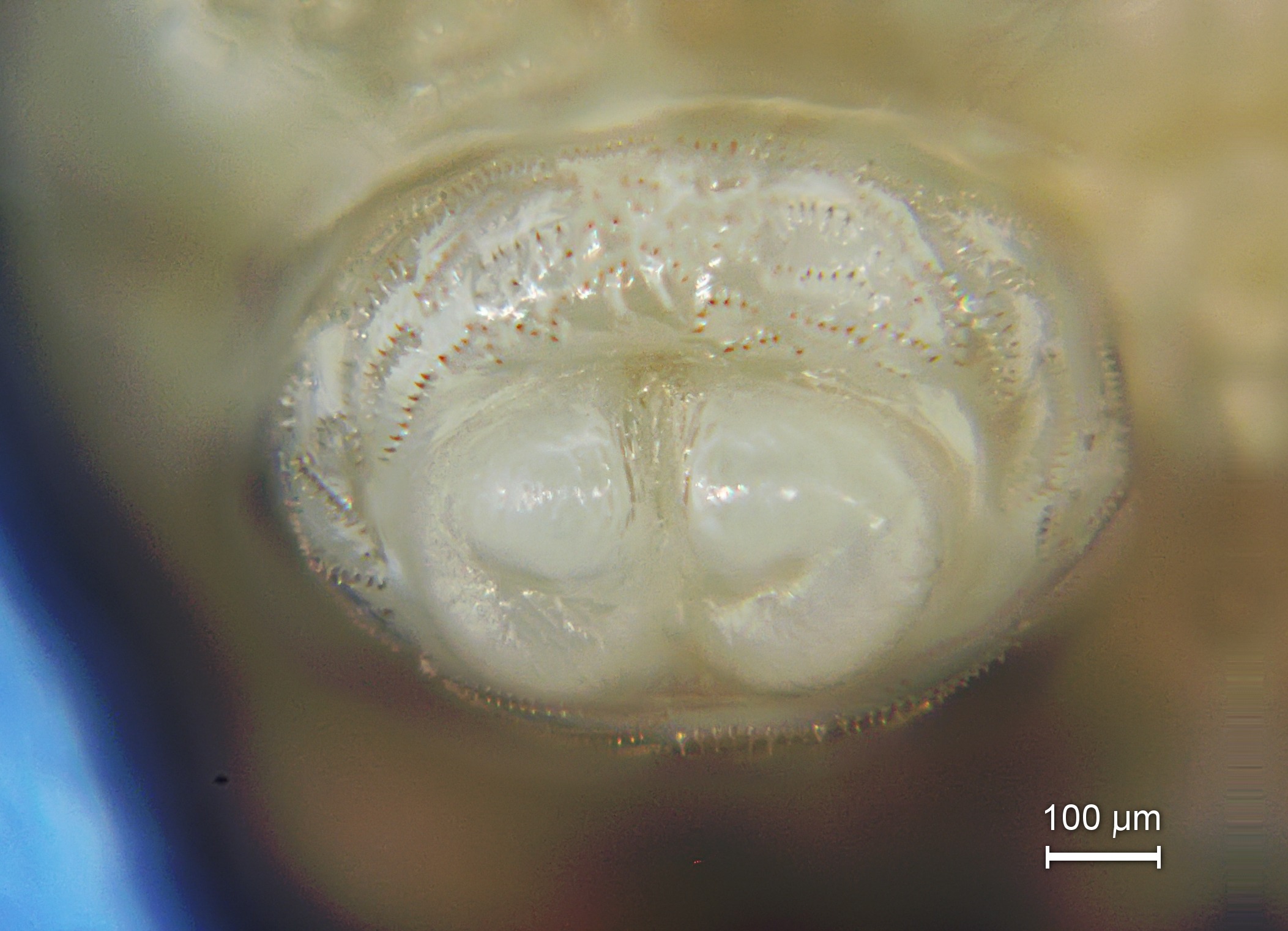
Anal lobe is Anastrepha ludens

=== Identification ===
Thorough knowledge of the morphology of Anastrepha is critical to run a taxonomic key and identify species. Morphological characters on the head, thorax, abdomen and ovipositor are very used in both traditional dichotomous and interactive key. In addition, it is important to know that some species groups in this genus need further revision, so that the identification could be difficult. To date, the most comprehensive identification tool for adult is available online, and it was developed by Norrbom et al. 2019. However, there are 28 more Anastrepha species, which were described by Norrbom in 2015, that are not included yet in the interactive key.

Knowledge of the larval morphology is important to identify genera and species. At least, there are three sources which are helpful for identification, but they are out of date to accurately identify larvae up to level of species. Thorough larval morphology is available online at http://www.delta-intkey.com/ffl/index.htm

=== Species ===
There are more than 300 Anastrepha species. This includes seven species from the former genus Toxotrypana, 266 species previously known, and 28 species described by Norrbom in 2015. From that total, thorough description and images of 273 species on the list below are freely available online at http://www.delta-intkey.com/anatox/index.htm.

Species group recognized by Norrbom et al. 2019
Species group	Name of species	Species group	Name of species
benjamini	Anastrepha atlantica Uramoto & Zucchi, 2010; Anastrepha benjamini Lima, 1938; Anastrepha connexa Lima, 1934; Anastrepha gigantea Stone, 1942; Anastrepha intermedia Norrbom & Korytkowski, 2012; Anastrepha magna Norrbom, 1997; Anastrepha neogigantea Norrbom & Korytkowski, 2012; A. sodalis Stone, 1942; A. superflua Stone, 1942; Anastrepha villosa Norrbom, 2015	raveni	Anastrepha levefasciata Norrbom & Korytkowski, 2011; Anastrepha raveni Norrbom & Korytkowski, 2011
caudata	Anastrepha brunnealata Norrbom & Caraballo, 2003; Anastrepha caudata Stone, 1942; Anastrepha hendeliana Lima, 1934	robusta, binodosa clade	Anastrepha binodosa Stone, 1942; Anastrepha miza Norrbom & Korytkowski, 2009; Anastrepha rojasi Norrbom & Korytkowski, 2009
daciformis	Anastrepha antilliensis Norrbom, 1998; Anastrepha aquila Norrbom, 1998; Anastrepha avispa Norrbom, 1998; Anastrepha bicolor Norrbom, 1998; Anastrepha castanea Norrbom, 1998; Anastrepha daciformis Bezzi, 1909; Anastrepha katiyari Norrbom, 1998; Anastrepha macrura Hendel, 1914; Anastrepha maculata Norrbom, 1998; Anastrepha murrayi Norrbom, 1998; Anastrepha pallens Coquillett, 1904; Anastrepha punensis, Tigrero & Salas, 2005; Anastrepha stonei, Steyskal, 1977; Anastrepha zucchii Norrbom, 1998	robusta, cryptostrepha clade	Anastrepha cordata Aldrich, 1925; Anastrepha cryptostrepha Hendel, 1942; Anastrepha cryptostrephoides Norrbom & Korytkowski, 2009; Anastrepha disticrux Norrbom & Korytkowski, 2009
dentata	Anastrepha acidusa (Walker, 1849); Anastrepha dentata (Stone, 1939); Anastrepha hamata (Loew, 1873); Anastrepha longicauda (Loew, 1873); Anastrepha melanoptera Norrbom, 2015; Anastrepha obscura Aldrich, 1925; Anastrepha paradentata Norrbom & Korytkowski, 2011; Anastrepha sagittata (Stone, 1939); Anastrepha sagittifera Zucchi, 1979; Anastrepha urichi Greene, 1934; Anastrepha zernyi Lima, 1934	robusta, lambda clade	Anastrepha lambda Norrbom & Korytkowski, 2009; Anastrepha nigrivittata Norrbom & Korytkowski, 2009
doryphoros	Anastrepha conflua Norrbom & Korytkowski, 2011; Anastrepha conjuncta Hendel, 1914; Anastrepha doryphoros Stone, 1942; Anastrepha freidbergi Norrbom, 1993	robusta, robusta clade	Anastrepha amaryllis Norrbom & Korytkowski, 2009; Anastrepha fenestrata Norrbom & Korytkowski, 2009; Anastrepha fenestrella Norrbom & Korytkowski, 2009; Anastrepha furcata Lima, 1934; Anastrepha fuscata Norrbom & Korytkowski, 2009; Anastrepha isolata Norrbom & Korytkowski, 2009; Anastrepha jamaicensis Norrbom & Korytkowski, 2009; Anastrepha nigrifascia Stone, 1942; Anastrepha phaeoptera Lima, 1934; Anastrepha pittieri Caraballo; Anastrepha pseudorobusta Norrbom & Korytkowski, 2009; Anastrepha robusta Greene, 1934; Anastrepha simulans Zucchi
fraterculus	Anastrepha acris Stone, 1942; Anastrepha amita Zucchi, 1979; Anastrepha ampliata Hernandez-Ortiz, 1991; Anastrepha amplidentata Norrbom 2015; Anastrepha antunesi Lima, 1938; Anastrepha bahiensis Lima, 1937; Anastrepha canalis Stone, 1942; Anastrepha carreroi Canal, 2010; Anastrepha cicra Norrbom, 2015; Anastrepha compressa Stone, 1942; Anastrepha coronilli Carrejo & Gonzalez, 1993; Anastrepha distincta Greene, 1934; Anastrepha durante Norrbom, 2015; Anastrepha fischeri Lima, 1934; Anastrepha fraterculus (Wiedemann, 1830); Anastrepha guianae Stone, 1942; Anastrepha inca Stone, 1942; Anastrepha irradiata Blanchard, 1961; Anastrepha irretita Stone, 1942; Anastrepha linharensis Uramoto & Zucchi, 2010; Anastrepha ludens (Loew, 1873); Anastrepha macra Stone, 1942; Anastrepha manizaliensis Norrbom & Korytkowski, 2005; Anastrepha matertela Zucchi, 1979; Anastrepha minensis Lima, 1937; Anastrepha obliqua (Macquart, 1835); Anastrepha perdita Stone, 1942; Anastrepha quiinae Lima, 1937; Anastrepha reichardti Zucchi, 1979; Anastrepha schultzi Blanchard, 1938; Anastrepha sororcula Zucchi, 1979; Anastrepha suspensa (Loew, 1862); Anastrepha tenella Zucchi, 1979; Anastrepha turicai Blanchard, 1961; Anastrepha turpiniae Stone, 1942; Anastrepha zachary Norrbom, 2015; Anastrepha zenildae Zucchi, 1979; Anastrepha zuelaniae Stone, 1942	robusta, speciosa clade	Anastrepha amazonensis Norrbom & Korytkowski, 2009; Anastrepha rafaeli Norrbom & Korytkowski, 2009; Anastrepha speciosa Stone, 1942
grandis	Anastrepha aberrans Norrbom, 1993; Anastrepha atrigona Hendel, 1914; Anastrepha bivittata (Macquart, 1843); Anastrepha castilloi Norrbom, 1991; Anastrepha eminens Norrbom, 2015; Anastrepha grandicarina Norrbom & Korytkowski, 2012; Anastrepha grandicula Norrbom, 1991; Anastrepha grandis (Macquart, 1846); Anastrepha shannoni Stone, 1942; Anastrepha trivittata Norrbom & Korytkowski, 2011	robusta, not assigned to a clade	Anastrepha bella Norrbom & Korytkowski, 2009; Anastrepha concava Greene, 1934; Anastrepha nigrina Norrbom, 2018. This species was previously known as Anastrepha nigra Norrbom & Korytkowski 2009; Anastrepha partita Norrbom & Korytkowski, 2009
hastata	Anastrepha apicata Norrbom & Korytkowski, 2003; Anastrepha cocorae Norrbom & Korytkowski, 2003; Anastrepha hastata Stone, 1942	schausi	Anastrepha fernandezi Caraballo, 1985; Anastrepha fuscicauda Norrbom & Korytkowski 2007; Anastrepha Hermosa, Norrbom 1988; Anastrepha lutea Stone, 1942; Anastrepha schausi Aldrich, 1925
leptozona	Anastrepha barnesi Aldrich, 1925; Anastrepha costalimai Autuori, 1936; Anastrepha elongata Fernandez, 1953; Anastrepha leptozona Hendel, 1914; Anastrepha sacha Tigrero, Anastrepha steyskali Korytkowski, 1974	serpentina	Anastrepha anomala Stone, 1942; Anastrepha anomoiae Norrbom, 2002; Anastrepha normalis Norrbom, 2002; Anastrepha ocresia (Walker, 1849); Anastrepha pseudanomala Norrbom, 2002; Anastrepha pulchella Norrbom, 2002; Anastrepha pulchra Stone, 1942; Anastrepha serpentina (Wiedemann, 1830); Anastrepha woodleyi Norrbom & Korytkowski, 2011
mucronota	Anastrepha aphelocentema Stone, 1942; Anastrepha atrox (Aldrich, 1925); Anastrepha bezzii Lima, 1934; Anastrepha borgmeieri Lima, 1934; Anastrepha caballeroi Norrbom, 2015; Anastrepha convoluta Stone, 1942; Anastrepha crebra Stone, 1942; Anastrepha debilis Stone, 1942; Anastrepha edentata Stone, 1942; Anastrepha elegans Blanchard, 1937; Anastrepha ericki Norrbom, 2015; Anastrepha galbina Stone, 1942; Anastrepha greenei Lima, 1937; Anastrepha gonzalezi Norrbom, 2015; Anastrepha hadracantha Norrbom & Korytkowski, 2012; Anastrepha hambletoni Lima, 1934; Anastrepha haplacantha hadracantha Norrbom & Korytkowski, 2012; Anastrepha hyperacantha hadracantha Norrbom & Korytkowski, 2012; Anastrepha inaequalis hadracantha Norrbom & Korytkowski, 2012; Anastrepha insulae Stone, 1942; Anastrepha integra (Loew, 1873); Anastrepha kimi Norrbom, 2015; Anastrepha korytkowski, 2015; Anastrepha kuhlmanni Lima, 1934; Anastrepha lanceola Stone, 1942; Anastrepha latilanceola Norrbom, 2015; Anastrepha loewi Stone, 1942; Anastrepha macracantha Norrbom & Korytkowski, 2012; Anastrepha magnicurva Norrbom & Korytkowski, 2012; Anastrepha megacantha Zucchi, 1984; Anastrepha mikuymono Tigrero; Anastrepha minuta Stone, 1942; Anastrepha mollyae Norrbom, 2015; Anastrepha mucronota Stone, 1942; Anastrepha nolazcoae Norrbom & Korytkowski, 2012; Anastrepha parallela (Wiedemann, 1830); Anastrepha protuberans Norrbom & Korytkowski, 2012; Anastrepha robynae Norrbom, 2015; Anastrepha quararibeae Lima, 1937; Anastrepha scobinae Stone, 1942; Anastrepha similis Greene, 1934; Anastrepha sinuosa Canal, 2010; Anastrepha sinvali Zucchi, 1982; Anastrepha soroana; Anastrepha stangei Norrbom & Korytkowski, 2012; Anastrepha submunda Lima, 1937; Anastrepha tubifera (Wlaker, 1858); Anastrepha tumbalai Tigrero & Salas, 2007; Anastrepha undosa Stone, 1942; Anastrepha willei Korytkowski, 2001; Anastrepha woodi Norrbom & Korytkowski, 2012	spatulata	Anastrepha alveata Stone, 1942; Anastrepha alveatoides Blanchard, 1961; Anastrepha distans Hendel, 1914; Anastrepha enkerlini Hernandez-Ortiz, 1999; Anastrepha haywardi Blanchard, 1937; Anastrepha interrupta Stone, 1942; Anastrepha lopezi Norrbom & Korytkowski, 2012; Anastrepha manihoti Lima, 1934; Anastrepha montei Lima, 1934; Anastrepha nascimentoi Zucchi, 1979; Anastrepha pickeli Lima, 1934; Anastrepha spatulata Stone, 1942; Anastrepha tecta Zucchi, 1979; Anastrepha umbrosa Blanchard, 1961
panamensis	Anastrepha disjuncta Norrbom, 2015; Anastrepha margarita Caraballo, 1985; Anastrepha panamensis Greene, 1934; Anastrepha zeteki Greene, 1934	striata	Anastrepha bistrigata Bezzi, 1919; Anastrepha ornate Aldrich, 1925; Anastrepha striata Schiner, 1868
pseudoparallela	Anastrepha amnis Stone, 1942; Anastrepha anduzei Stone, 1942; Anastrepha asetaocelata Tigrero; Anastrepha chiclayae Greene, 1934; Anastrepha consobrina (Loew, 1873); Anastrepha curitis Stone, 1942; Anastrepha dissimilis Stone, 1942; Anastrepha dryas Stone, 1942; Anastrepha ethalea (Walker, 1849); Anastrepha glochin Uramoto & Zucchi, 2010; Anastrepha guevarai Norrbom, 2015; Anastrepha limae Stone, 1942; Anastrepha lutzi Lima, 1934; Anastrepha martinsi Uramoto & Zucchi; Anastrepha mburucuyae Blanchard, 1961; Anastrepha munda Schiner, 1868; Anastrepha pallida Norrbom,1997; Anastrepha pallidipennis Greene, 1934; Anastrepha passiflorae Greene, 1934; Anastrepha pastranai Blanchard, 1961; Anastrepha pseudoparallela (Loew,1873); Anastrepha townsendi Greene, 1934; Anastrepha tunariensis Norrbom, 2015; Anastrepha velezi Norrbom, 1997; Anastrepha xanthochaeta Hendel, 1914	tripunctata	Anastrepha maya Hernández-Ortiz, 2004; Anastrepha relicta Hernández-Ortiz, 2004; Anastrepha tripunctata Wulp, 1899
punctata	Anastrepha aczeli Blanchard, 1961; Anastrepha luederwaldti Lima, 1934; Anastrepha morvasi Uramoto & Zucchi, 1999; Anastrepha punctata Hendel, 1914	Not assigned to a species group	Anastrepha acca Norrbom, 2015; Anastrepha acuminata Canal, 2010; Anastrepha adami Norrbom 2015; Anastrepha annonae Norrbom 2015; Anastrepha anopla Norrbom & Korytkowski, 2012; Anastrepha barbiellinii Lima, 1938; Anastrepha barrettoi Zucchi, 1979; Anastrepha belenensis Zucchi, 1979; Anastrepha bondari Lima, 1934; Anastrepha breviapex Norrbom, 2015; Anastrepha buscki Stone, 1942; Anastrepha camba Norrbom, 2015; Anastrepha cruzi Lima, 1934; Anastrepha duckei Lima, 1934; Anastrepha echaratiensis Norrbom, 2015; Anastrepha flavipennis Greene, 1934; Anastrepha fractura Stone, 1942; Anastrepha gusi Norrbom, 2015; Anastrepha hamadryas (Stone, 1939); Anastrepha matogrossensis Norrbom & Uchoa, 2011; Anastrepha mixta Zucchi, 1979; Anastrepha nigripalpis Hendel, 1914; Anastrepha oiapoquensis Norrbom & Uchoa, 2011; Anastrepha pacifica Hernandez-Ortiz, 1991; Anastrepha palae Stone, 1942; Anastrepha parishi Stone, 1942; Anastrepha perezi Norrbom, 2015; Anastrepha psidivora Norrbom, 2015; Anastrepha repanda Blanchard, 1961; Anastrepha rheediae Stone, 1942; Anastrepha rolliniana Tigrero, 2007; Anastrepha rondoniensis Norrbom, 2015; Anastrepha rosilloi Blanchard, 1961; Anastrepha siculigera Norrbom & Uchoa, 2011; Anastrepha sylvicola Knab, 1915; Anastrepha teli Stone, 1942; Anastrepha teretis Stone, 1942; Anastrepha trimaculata Tigrero & Salas 2007; Anastrepha tsachila Tigrero, 2007; Anastrepha tumida Stone, 1942; Anastrepha vermespinata
ramosa	Anastrepha peneramosa Norrbom & Korytkowski, 2012; Anastrepha ramosa Stone, 1942; Anastrepha subramosa Stone, 1942	curvicauda	Formerly in the genus Toxotrypana: Anastrepha australis (Blanchard, 1960); Anastrepha curvicauda (Gerstaecker, 1860); Anastrepha littoralis (Blanchard, 1960); Anastrepha nigra (Blanchard, 1960); Anastrepha picciola (Blanchard, 1960); Anastrepha proseni (Blanchard, 1960); Anastrepha recurcauda (Tigrero, 1992)

== Distribution ==
Genus Anastrepha is widespread from southern United States (Texas and Florida) to northern Argentina, including Great and Lesser Antilles. The country records include United States, Mexico, Belize, Bolivia, Brazil, Colombia, Costa Rica, Ecuador, British Guiana, French Guiana, Guatemala, Guyana, Honduras, Mexico, Nicaragua, Peru, Suriname, Cuba, Republica Dominicana, Puerto Rico, Jamaica, Trinidad and Tobago, Argentina, Paraguay, and Venezuela.

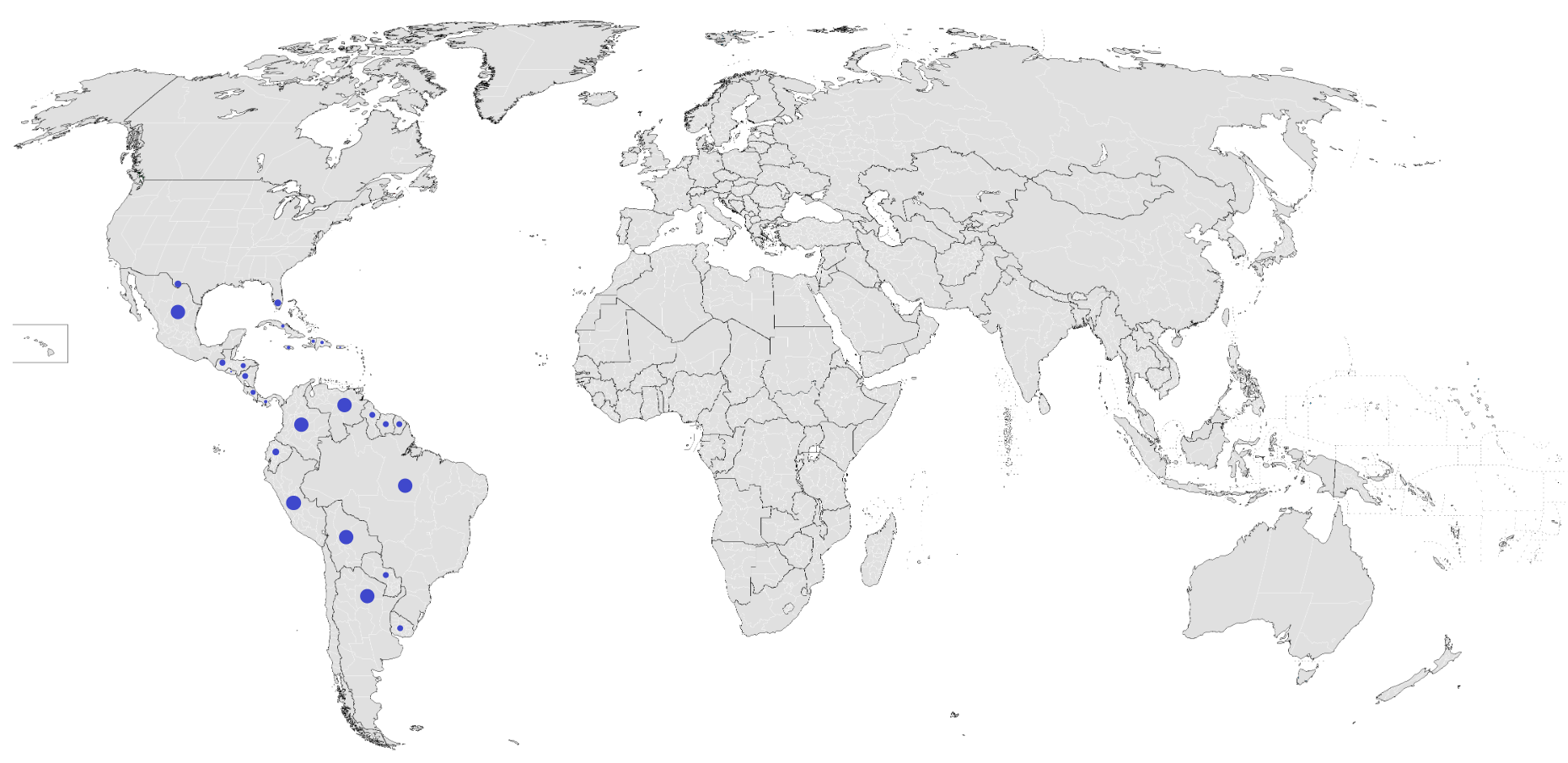
Geographical distribution of genus Anastrepha in the Americas.
