= A. fenestrata =

A. fenestrata may refer to:

- Alveopora fenestrata, a coral species in the genus Alveopora found in the Houtman Abrolhos
- Amphisbaena fenestrata, a worm lizard species
- Anastrepha fenestrata, a fruit fly species
- Apha fenestrata, Butler, a moth species in the genus Apha and the family Eupterotidae found in India
- Ausia fenestrata, a curious Ediacaran period tunicate fossil

== See also ==
- Fenestrata (disambiguation)
