= Anastrepha consobrina =

Scientific classification
- Domain: Eukaryota
- Kingdom: Animalia
- Phylum: Arthropoda
- Class: Insecta
- Order: Diptera
- Family: Tephritidae
- Genus: Anastrepha
- Species: A. consobrina

Binomial name
- Anastrepha consobrina (Loew, 1873)

Species of fly

Anastrepha consobrina is a species of tephritid or fruit flies in the genus Anastrepha of the family Tephritidae.
