= Anastrepha grandis =

Scientific classification
- Kingdom: Animalia
- Phylum: Arthropoda
- Class: Insecta
- Order: Diptera
- Family: Tephritidae
- Genus: Anastrepha
- Species: A. grandis

Binomial name
- Anastrepha grandis (Macquart, 1846)

Species of fly

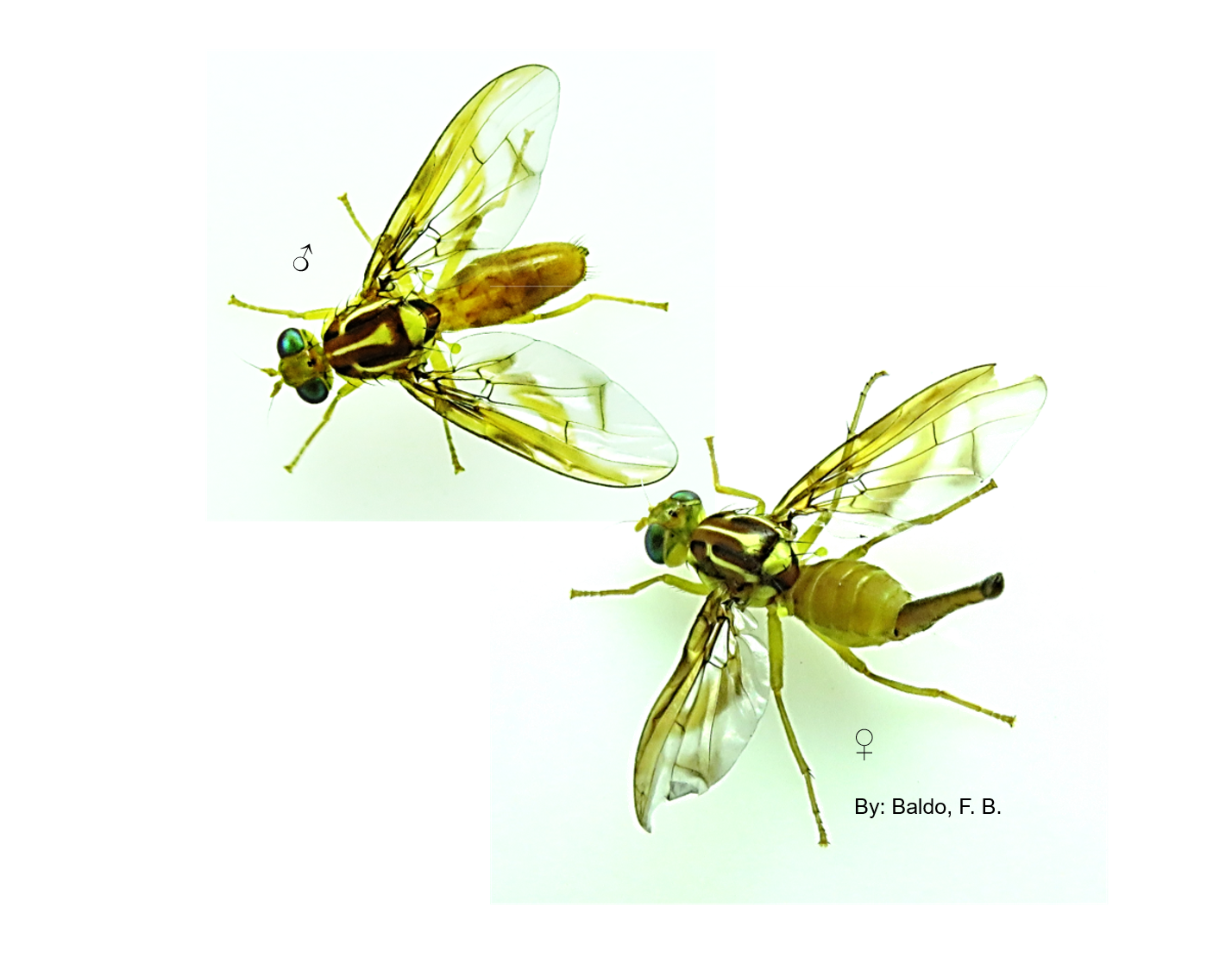
South American Cucurbit Fruit Flies.

Anastrepha grandis is a fruit fly, also known as the South American cucurbit fruit fly. It is a pest of various cultivated species of Cucurbitaceae, especially the pumpkin, squash and melon. Anastrepha grandis is found in almost all South American countries.

== Importance to agriculture ==
Once a pest of minor to moderate importance generally, it has become a rather important pest. This kind of species is potentially of economic importance in Florida and southern Texas should it ever be introduced there.
