= Diachasmimorpha mellea =

Scientific classification
- Kingdom: Animalia
- Phylum: Arthropoda
- Clade: Pancrustacea
- Class: Insecta
- Order: Hymenoptera
- Family: Braconidae
- Genus: Diachasmimorpha
- Species: D. mellea

Binomial name
- Diachasmimorpha mellea (Gahan, 1915)

Species of wasp

Diachasmimorpha mellea (formerly known as Biosteres melleus) is a species of braconid parasitoid wasp which attacks multiple species of Rhagoletis fruit flies, including R. pomonella, the apple maggot fly. This wasp has been found throughout much of the United States and in Central Mexico. It is morphologically similar to and has overlapping range with another apple maggot parasitoid, Diachasma alloeum.
