= Anastrepha ethalea =

Scientific classification
- Kingdom: Animalia
- Phylum: Arthropoda
- Class: Insecta
- Order: Diptera
- Family: Tephritidae
- Genus: Anastrepha
- Species: A. ethalea

Binomial name
- Anastrepha ethalea (Walker, 1849)

Species of fly

Anastrepha ethalea is a species of tephritid or fruit flies in the genus Anastrepha of the family Tephritidae.
