= Anastrepha bivittata =

Scientific classification
- Kingdom: Animalia
- Phylum: Arthropoda
- Clade: Pancrustacea
- Class: Insecta
- Order: Diptera
- Family: Tephritidae
- Genus: Anastrepha
- Species: A. bivittata

Binomial name
- Anastrepha bivittata (Macquart 1843)

Synonyms
- Anastrepha fumipennis Lima, 1934

Species of fly

Anastrepha bivittata is a species of tephritid or fruit flies in the genus Anastrepha of the family Tephritidae. The only known host plant is Gessiopermum laeve (Vell.) Miers.
