= Anastrepha integra =

Scientific classification
- Kingdom: Animalia
- Phylum: Arthropoda
- Class: Insecta
- Order: Diptera
- Family: Tephritidae
- Genus: Anastrepha
- Species: A. integra

Binomial name
- Anastrepha integra (Loew, 1873)

Species of fly

Anastrepha integra is a species of tephritid or fruit flies in the genus Anastrepha of the family Tephritidae.
