= Diachasmimorpha =

Scientific classification
- Domain: Eukaryota
- Kingdom: Animalia
- Phylum: Arthropoda
- Class: Insecta
- Order: Hymenoptera
- Family: Braconidae
- Subfamily: Opiinae
- Genus: Diachasmimorpha; Viereck, 1913

Genus of wasps

Diachasmimorpha is a genus of the Opiinae subfamily of braconid parasitoid wasps and was first described in 1913. It is a small genus relatively restricted to the subtropics but also includes species in the Nearctic and northern Neotropical Regions. The genus is most clearly defined by an apical sinuate ovipositor, which is a synapomorphic character and defines a monophyletic lineage.

== Taxa ==
- Diachasmimorpha aino
- Diachasmimorpha albobalteata
- Diachasmimorpha brevistyli
- Diachasmimorpha carinata
- Diachasmimorpha dacusii
- Diachasmimorpha feijeni
- Diachasmimorpha fullawayi
- Diachasmimorpha hageni
- Diachasmimorpha hildagensis
- Diachasmimorpha juglandis
- Diachasmimorpha kraussii
- Diachasmimorpha longicaudata
- Diachasmimorpha martinalujai
- Diachasmimorpha mellea
- Diachasmimorpha mexicana
- Diachasmimorpha norrbomi
- Diachasmimorpha paeoniae
- Diachasmimorpha sanguinea
- Diachasmimorpha sublaevis
- Diachasmimorpha tryoni
