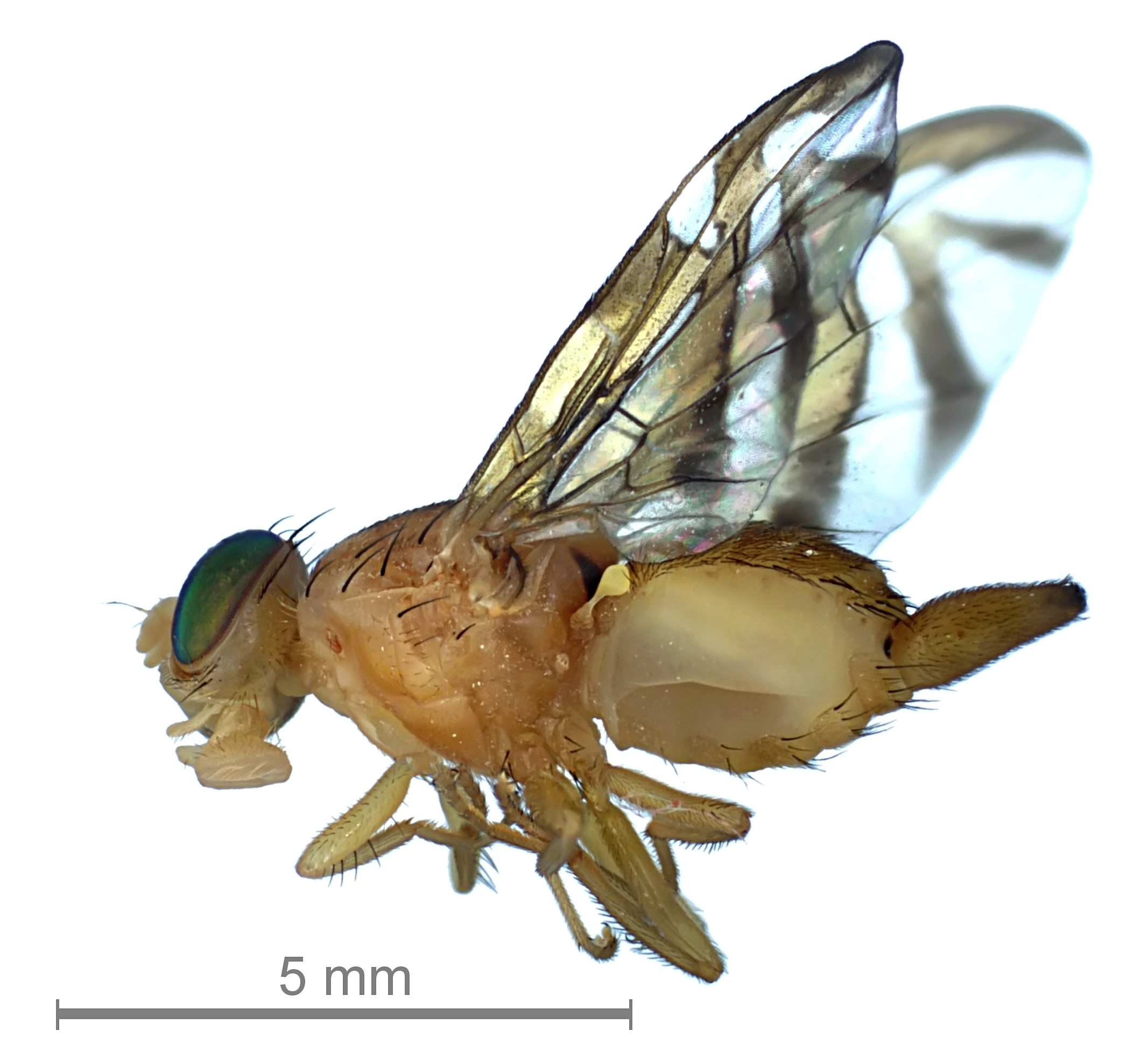

Scientific classification
- Kingdom: Animalia
- Phylum: Arthropoda
- Class: Insecta
- Order: Diptera
- Family: Tephritidae
- Genus: Anastrepha
- Species: A. obliqua

Binomial name
- Anastrepha obliqua (Macquart, 1835)

= Anastrepha obliqua =

Species of fly

Anastrepha obliqua is a species of fruit fly. It is the most important fruit fly pest of mangoes in Neotropics and attacks a wide range of other spicy fruits. A. obliqua is widespread in Mexico, Central and South America and the West Indies. It is sometimes called the West Indian fruit fly in English.

== Description ==
Anastrepha obliqua is the most abundant species of Anastrepha in the West Indies and Panama. Like the Caribbean fruit fly, Anastrepha obliqua also attacks other tropical fruits of little economic importance. A. obliqua has also been called the Antillean fruit fly.
