= Anastrepha fenestrata =

Scientific classification
- Kingdom: Animalia
- Phylum: Arthropoda
- Class: Insecta
- Order: Diptera
- Family: Tephritidae
- Genus: Anastrepha
- Species: A. fenestrata

Binomial name
- Anastrepha fenestrata Lutz & Lima, 1918

Species of fly

Anastrepha fenestrata is a species of tephritid or fruit flies in the genus Anastrepha.
