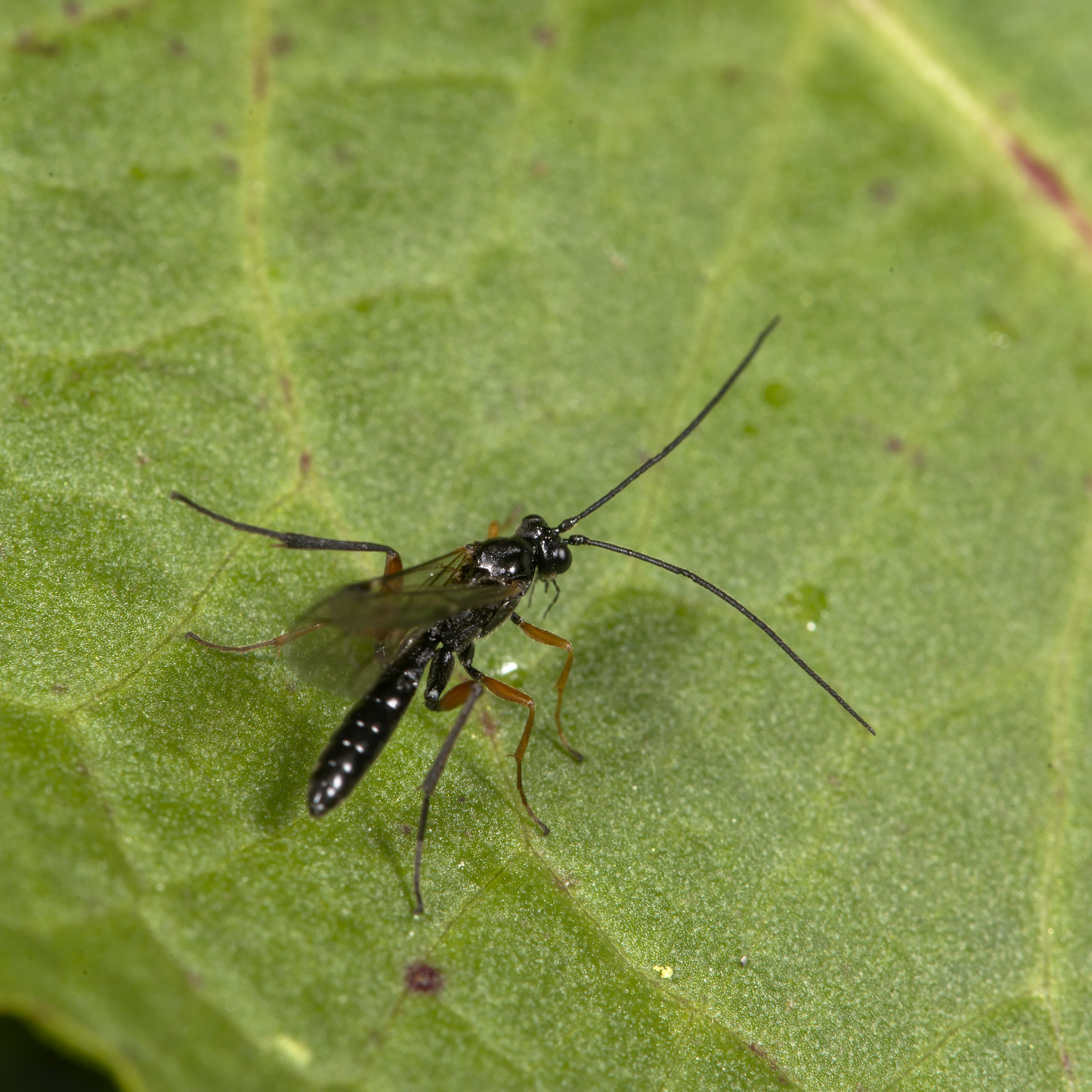
- Female D. longicaudata

Scientific classification
- Kingdom: Animalia
- Phylum: Arthropoda
- Class: Insecta
- Order: Hymenoptera
- Family: Braconidae
- Genus: Diachasmimorpha
- Species: D. longicaudata

Binomial name
- Diachasmimorpha longicaudata (Ashmead, 1905)

= Diachasmimorpha longicaudata =

Species of wasp

Diachasmimorpha longicaudata is a solitary species of parasitoid wasp and an endoparasitoid of tephritid fruit fly larvae. D. longicaudata is native to many countries in Southeast Asia and subtropical regions and has also been introduced to many other countries as a biological control agent. It is now considered the most extensively used parasitoid for biocontrol of fruit flies in both the southern portion of the United States and Latin America. D. longicaudata is especially useful for agricultural purposes in the control of fruit flies as it is easily mass-reared and has the ability to infect a variety of hosts within the genus Bactrocera. A negative factor in its use as a biocontrol agent is that it is known to oviposit in grapefruit in the state of Florida. This has resulted in quarantines on grapefruit shipped internationally as well as domestically. Research is ongoing to determine whether D. longicaudata is actually a single species, or if it contains multiple species. It is likely multiple biological species separated by both reproductive isolation and morphological characteristics such as wing geometry.

== Distribution ==
Diachasmimorpha longicaudata originated in the Indo-pacific region of Asia. D. longicaudata has been disseminated into countries in the Americas including United States, Colombia, Costa Rica, Guatemala, El Salvador, Nicaragua, and Trinidad, and Brazil. There are stable colonies in Hawaii and Florida in the United States.

== Morphology ==
The genus Diachasmimorpha has traditionally been defined by the morphology of their apically sinuate ovipositor. D. longicaudata has a body length of between 2.8 and 5.4 mm. The adult male is smaller than the female with a body length of up to 4.0 mm. The body is a reddish-brown color and antennae are longer than the body. Wings are clear. Females have a long ovipositor. The gaster of males and females differs slightly with the female having a dorsal central black band while the gaster of the male has a dark brown to black dorsal posterior.

Three cryptic species have been identified within D. longicaudata based on genetic analysis and geometric differences in wing venation. In forced-contact mating between the three cryptic species reproduction was rare and resulted in sterile female offspring. Subspecies have also been reported based on differing geographical areas with high variation being associated variation of resources. As many as five subspecies have previously been identified around the world and have been primarily characterized by color.

== Life cycle ==
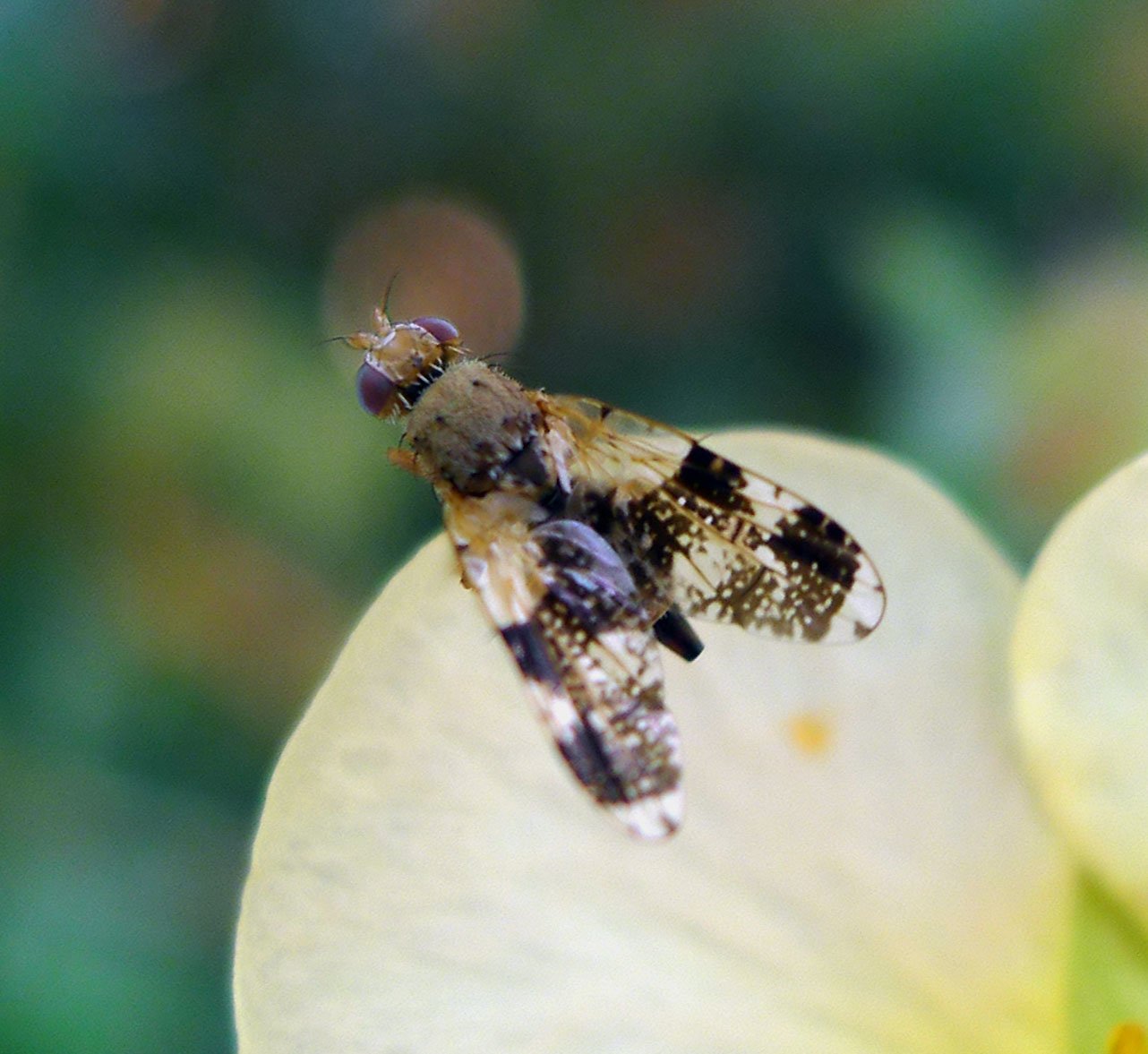
The host organism of Diachasmimorpha longicaudata. Tephritid fruit flies. Pictured is Tephritis formosa.

Both males and females are solitary. Third instar tephritid fruit fly larvae are the typical hosts. Female adults of D. longicaudata are attracted to fermenting fruit and then are able to find larvae by sound. Females lay 13-24 eggs per day using her elongated ovipositor to reach the fly larvae. Typically only one egg is laid per instar larvae with exceptions when hosts are insufficient; however only one pupa will reach maturity. Eggs take between two and five days to hatch and will take 18–23 days to reach adulthood. Male parasitoids develop faster than female, emerging two to three days before females from their host.

== Symbiotic virus ==
Diachasmimorpha longicaudata entomopoxvirus (DlEPV) is a notable symbiotic virus that affects Diachasmimorpha longicaudata. DlEPV has a double-stranded DNA genome of 250–300 kb A-T rich with more than 60 of the genome being A-T.

During oviposition, the parasitic wasp infects tephritid fruit fly with DlEPV as well as rhabdovirus (DlRhV). Both DlEPV and DlRhV replicate within the epidermal cells of their new host. These viruses are found within the adult wasps and retained in subsequent generations. This is the first symbiotic EPV described to date from a parasitic wasp.
