= S. intermedia =

S. intermedia may refer to:

- Siren intermedia, the lesser siren, an aquatic salamander species native to the eastern United States and northern Mexico
- Sorbus intermedia, the Swedish whitebeam, a tree species found in southern Sweden
- Splendrillia intermedia, a sea snail species
- Sporophila intermedia, the grey seedeater, a bird species found in Brazil, Colombia, Guyana, Trinidad and Tobago and Venezuela
- Stanhopea intermedia, an orchid species endemic to southwestern Mexico
- Stigmella intermedia, a moth species found in Ohio, Arkansas, Kentucky and Ontario
- Strauzia intermedia, a fruit fly species

== Synonyms ==
- Scalaria intermedia, a synonym for Cirsotrema zelebori, a sea snail species
- Sclerotinia intermedia, a synonym for Sclerotinia minor, a plant pathogen species

== See also ==
- Intermedia (disambiguation)
