= Blepharoneurinae =

Scientific classification
- Domain: Eukaryota
- Kingdom: Animalia
- Phylum: Arthropoda
- Class: Insecta
- Order: Diptera
- Family: Tephritidae
- Subfamily: Blepharoneurinae

Subfamily of flies

The Blepharoneurinae are a subfamily of the fruit fly family Tephritidae comprising five genera and 34 species.

== Genera ==
- Baryglossa
- Blepharoneura
- Ceratodacus
- Hexaptilona
- †Problepharoneura

== See also ==
- Ceratodacus priscus
