= Euaresta stelligera =

Scientific classification
- Kingdom: Animalia
- Phylum: Arthropoda
- Class: Insecta
- Order: Diptera
- Family: Tephritidae
- Subfamily: Tephritinae
- Tribe: Tephritini
- Genus: Euaresta
- Species: E. stelligera

Binomial name
- Euaresta stelligera (Coquillett, 1894)

Synonyms
- Trypeta stelligera Coquillett, 1894

Species of fly

Euaresta stelligera is a species of fruit fly in the genus Euaresta of the family Tephritidae.
