= Euaresta bellula =

Scientific classification
- Kingdom: Animalia
- Phylum: Arthropoda
- Class: Insecta
- Order: Diptera
- Family: Tephritidae
- Subfamily: Tephritinae
- Tribe: Tephritini
- Genus: Euaresta
- Species: E. bellula

Binomial name
- Euaresta bellula Snow, 1894

Species of fly

Euaresta bellula is a species of tephritid or fruit flies in the genus Euaresta of the family Tephritidae.
