= Euaresta toba =

Scientific classification
- Kingdom: Animalia
- Phylum: Arthropoda
- Class: Insecta
- Order: Diptera
- Family: Tephritidae
- Subfamily: Tephritinae
- Tribe: Tephritini
- Genus: Euaresta
- Species: E. toba

Binomial name
- Euaresta toba (Lindner, 1928)

Synonyms
- Camaromyia toba Lindner, 1928

Species of fly

Euaresta toba is a species of fruit fly in the genus Euaresta of the family Tephritidae.

== Distribution ==
Argentina.
