= Strauzia rugosa =

Scientific classification
- Kingdom: Animalia
- Phylum: Arthropoda
- Class: Insecta
- Order: Diptera
- Family: Tephritidae
- Genus: Strauzia
- Species: S. rugosa

Binomial name
- Strauzia rugosa Stoltzfus, 1988

Species of fly

Strauzia rugosa is a species of tephritid or fruit flies in the genus Strauzia of the family Tephritidae.
