= Blepharoneura =

Scientific classification
- Kingdom: Animalia
- Phylum: Arthropoda
- Class: Insecta
- Order: Diptera
- Family: Tephritidae
- Subfamily: Blepharoneurinae
- Genus: Blepharoneura; Loew, 1873

Genus of flies

Blepharoneura is a genus of fruit fly in the family Tephritidae. They are Neotropical in distribution, and only breed in Cucurbitaceae plants.

== Species ==
- Blepharoneura amazonensis Lima & Leite, 1952
- Blepharoneura amplihyalina Norrbom & Condon, 2010
- Blepharoneura apaapa Norrbom & Condon, 2010
- Blepharoneura aspiculosa Norrbom & Condon, 2010
- Blepharoneura atomaria (Fabricius, 1805)
- Blepharoneura bidigitata Norrbom & Condon, 2010
- Blepharoneura bipunctata Norrbom & Condon, 2010
- Blepharoneura biseriata Wulp, 1899
- Blepharoneura bivittata Norrbom & Condon, 2010
- Blepharoneura brevivittata Norrbom & Condon, 2010
- Blepharoneura chaconi Norrbom & Condon, 2010
- Blepharoneura cornelli Norrbom & Condon, 2010
- Blepharoneura cyclantherae Norrbom & Condon, 2010
- Blepharoneura diva Giglio-Tos, 1893
- Blepharoneura femoralis Wulp, 1899
- Blepharoneura fernandezi Norrbom & Condon, 2010
- Blepharoneura furcifer Hendel, 1914
- Blepharoneura hirsuta Bates, 1933
- Blepharoneura hyalinella Norrbom & Condon, 2010
- Blepharoneura impunctata Hendel, 1914
- Blepharoneura io Giglio-Tos, 1893
- Blepharoneura isolata Norrbom & Condon, 2010
- Blepharoneura longicauda Hendel, 1914
- Blepharoneura lutea Norrbom & Condon, 2010
- Blepharoneura macwilliamsae Norrbom & Condon, 2010
- Blepharoneura manchesteri Condon & Norrbom, 1994
- Blepharoneura marshalli Norrbom & Condon, 2010
- Blepharoneura mexicana Norrbom & Condon, 2010
- Blepharoneura mikenoltei Norrbom & Condon, 2010
- Blepharoneura multipunctata Norrbom & Condon, 2010
- Blepharoneura nigriapex Norrbom & Condon, 2010
- Blepharoneura nigrifemur Norrbom & Condon, 2010
- Blepharoneura nigripilosa Hering, 1935
- Blepharoneura osmundsonae Norrbom & Condon, 2010
- Blepharoneura parva Hendel, 1914
- Blepharoneura perkinsi Condon & Norrbom, 1994
- Blepharoneura poecilogastra (Loew, 1873)
- Blepharoneura poecilosoma (Schiner, 1868)
- Blepharoneura pulchella (Wulp, 1899)
- Blepharoneura punctistigma Norrbom & Condon, 2010
- Blepharoneura quadristriata Wulp, 1899
- Blepharoneura quetzali Norrbom & Condon, 2010
- Blepharoneura regina Giglio-Tos, 1893
- Blepharoneura ruptafascia Norrbom & Condon, 2010
- Blepharoneura rupta (Wulp, 1899)
- Blepharoneura septemdigitata Norrbom & Condon, 2010
- Blepharoneura sinepuncta Norrbom & Condon, 2010
- Blepharoneura splendida Giglio-Tos, 1893
- Blepharoneura tau Norrbom & Condon, 2010
- Blepharoneura thetis Hendel, 1914
- Blepharoneura unifasciata Norrbom & Condon, 2010
- Blepharoneura variabilis Norrbom & Condon, 2010
- Blepharoneura wasbaueri Norrbom & Condon, 2010
- Blepharoneura zumbadoi Norrbom & Condon, 2010
