= Blepharoneura parva =

Scientific classification
- Kingdom: Animalia
- Phylum: Arthropoda
- Clade: Pancrustacea
- Class: Insecta
- Order: Diptera
- Family: Tephritidae
- Genus: Blepharoneura
- Species: B. parva

Binomial name
- Blepharoneura parva (Hendel, 1914)

Species of insect

Blepharoneura parva is a species of fly in the family Tephritidae.

== Taxonomy ==
Blepharoneura parva was first described in 1914 by Friedrich Georg Hendel.
