= Strauzia arculata =

Scientific classification
- Domain: Eukaryota
- Kingdom: Animalia
- Phylum: Arthropoda
- Class: Insecta
- Order: Diptera
- Family: Tephritidae
- Genus: Strauzia
- Species: S. arculata

Binomial name
- Strauzia arculata (Loew, 1873)

Species of fly

Strauzia arculata is a species of tephritid or fruit flies in the genus Strauzia of the family Tephritidae.
