= Strauzia bushi =

Scientific classification
- Kingdom: Animalia
- Phylum: Arthropoda
- Class: Insecta
- Order: Diptera
- Family: Tephritidae
- Genus: Strauzia
- Species: S. bushi

Binomial name
- Strauzia bushi Lisowski, 1986

Species of fly

Strauzia bushi is a species of tephritid or fruit flies in the genus Strauzia of the family Tephritidae.
