= Hexaptilona =

Scientific classification
- Domain: Eukaryota
- Kingdom: Animalia
- Phylum: Arthropoda
- Class: Insecta
- Order: Diptera
- Family: Tephritidae
- Subfamily: Blepharoneurinae
- Genus: Hexaptilona; Hering, 1941

Genus of flies

Hexaptilona is a genus of tephritid or fruit flies in the family Tephritidae.
