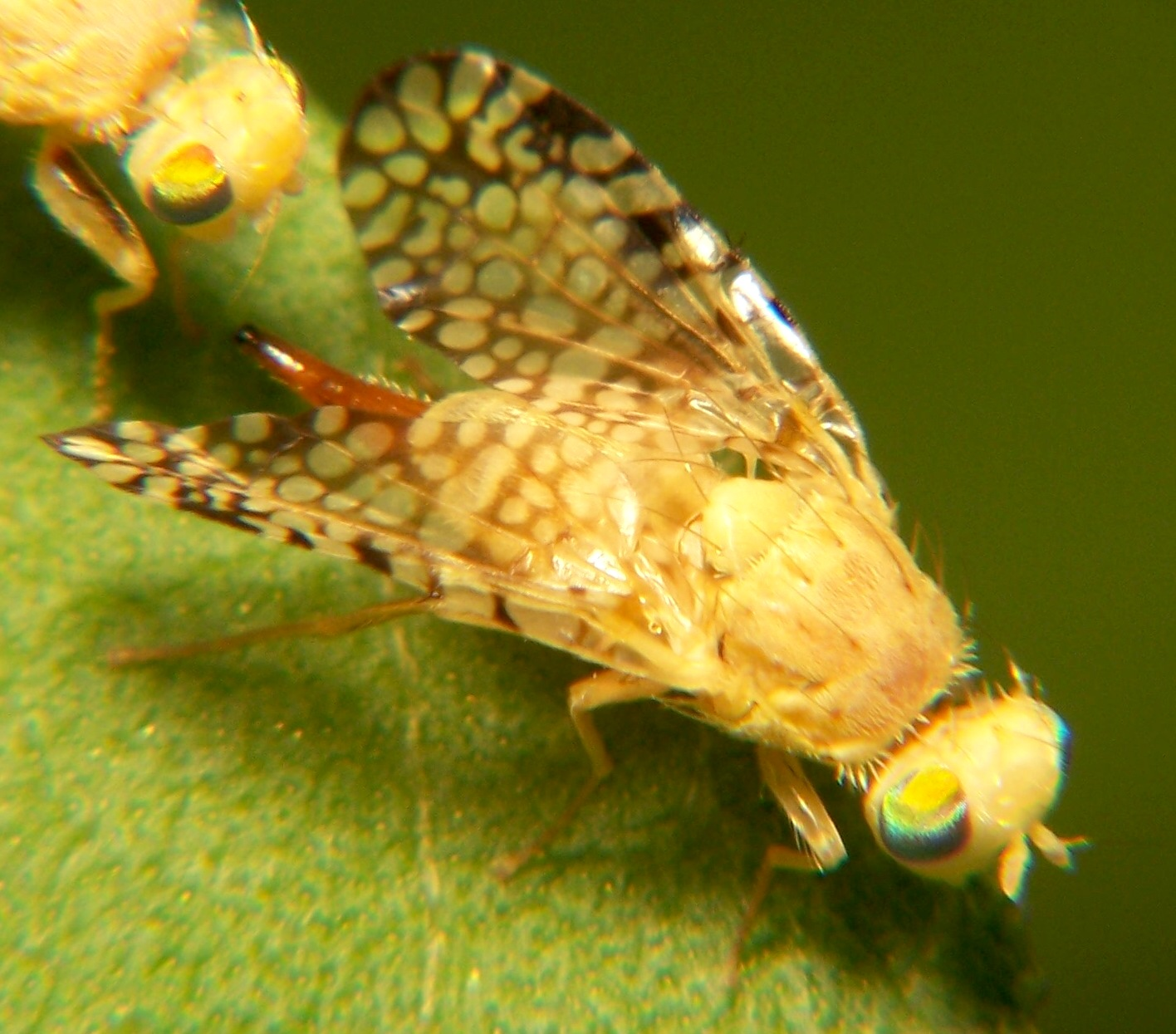
- Euaresta aequalis

Scientific classification
- Kingdom: Animalia
- Phylum: Arthropoda
- Clade: Pancrustacea
- Class: Insecta
- Order: Diptera
- Family: Tephritidae
- Subfamily: Tephritinae
- Tribe: Tephritini
- Genus: Euaresta; Loew, 1873

Type species
- Trypeta festiva Loew, 1872

Synonyms
- Camaromyia Hendel, 1914; Setigeresta Benjamin, 1934

= Euaresta =

Genus of flies

Euaresta is a genus of flies in the family Tephritidae that live in plants of the closely related genera Ambrosia, Xanthium, and Dicoria, and feed on their flowers and seeds.

The 15 species of Euaresta are endemic to the Americas, eight being native to North America and seven to South America. Only one specimen has been collected in Central America (E. toba in El Salvador), and one or two species occur in the Antilles.

Euaresta bullans has been introduced, perhaps accidentally, from South America to California and Arizona, southern Europe, the Middle East, South Africa and Australia, where it attacks spiny cocklebur (Xanthium spinosum). E. aequalis has been introduced to Fiji and Australia, to act as a biological control agent of common cocklebur (Xanthium strumarium). E. bella was released in Europe to control ragweed (Ambrosia artemisiifolia), but did not become established there.

== Species ==
Fifteen species are recognised in the genus Euaresta:

North America

- E. aequalis (Loew, 1862)
- E. bella (Loew, 1862)
- E. bellula Snow, 1894
- E. festiva (Loew, 1862)
- E. jonesi (Curran, 1932)
- E. stelligera (Coquillett, 1894)
- E. stigmatica Coquillett, 1902
- E. tapetis (Coquillett, 1894)

South America

- E. bullans (Wiedemann, 1830)
- E. meridionalis Aczél, 1952
- E. philodema (Hendel, 1914)
- E. regularis Norrbom, 1993
- E. reticulata (Hendel, 1914)
- E. toba (Lindner, 1928)
- E. versicolor Norrbom, 1993
