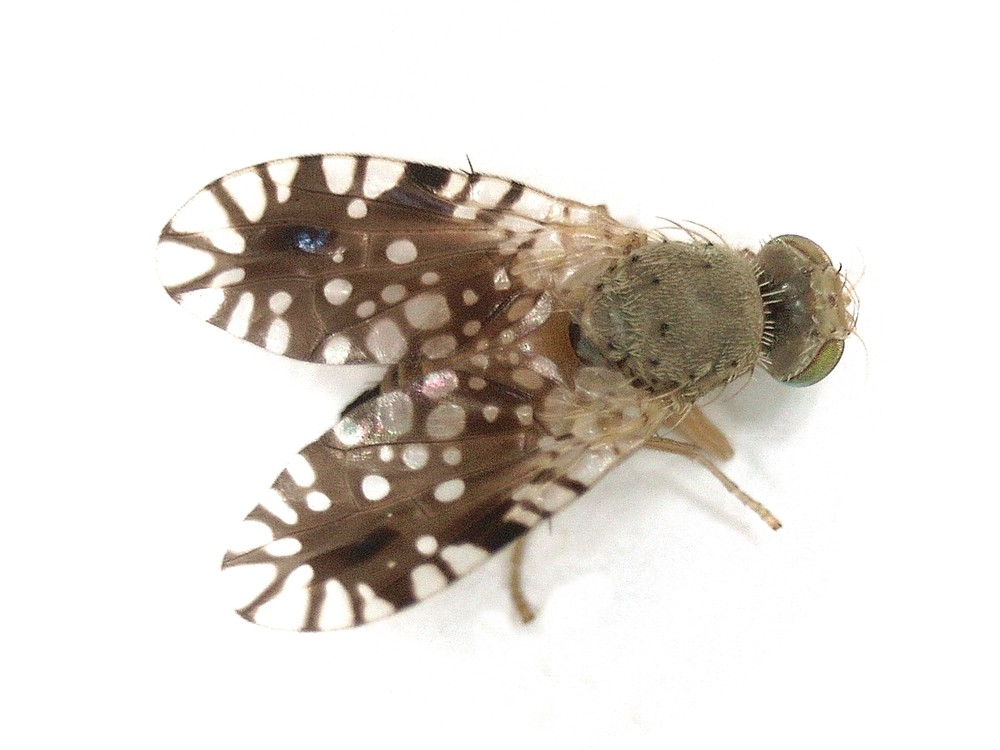

Scientific classification
- Kingdom: Animalia
- Phylum: Arthropoda
- Class: Insecta
- Order: Diptera
- Family: Tephritidae
- Subfamily: Tephritinae
- Tribe: Tephritini
- Genus: Euaresta
- Species: E. bella

Binomial name
- Euaresta bella (Loew, 1862)

Synonyms
- Trypeta bella Loew, 1862

= Euaresta bella =

Species of fly

Euaresta bella is a species of tephritid or fruit flies in the family Tephritidae.

The larvae feed on Ambrosia artemisiifolia, the only known host. There is one generation per year.
