= Strauzia gigantei =

Scientific classification
- Domain: Eukaryota
- Kingdom: Animalia
- Phylum: Arthropoda
- Class: Insecta
- Order: Diptera
- Family: Tephritidae
- Genus: Strauzia
- Species: S. gigantei

Binomial name
- Strauzia gigantei Steyskal, 1986

Species of fly

Strauzia gigantei is a species of tephritid or fruit flies in the genus Strauzia of the family Tephritidae.
