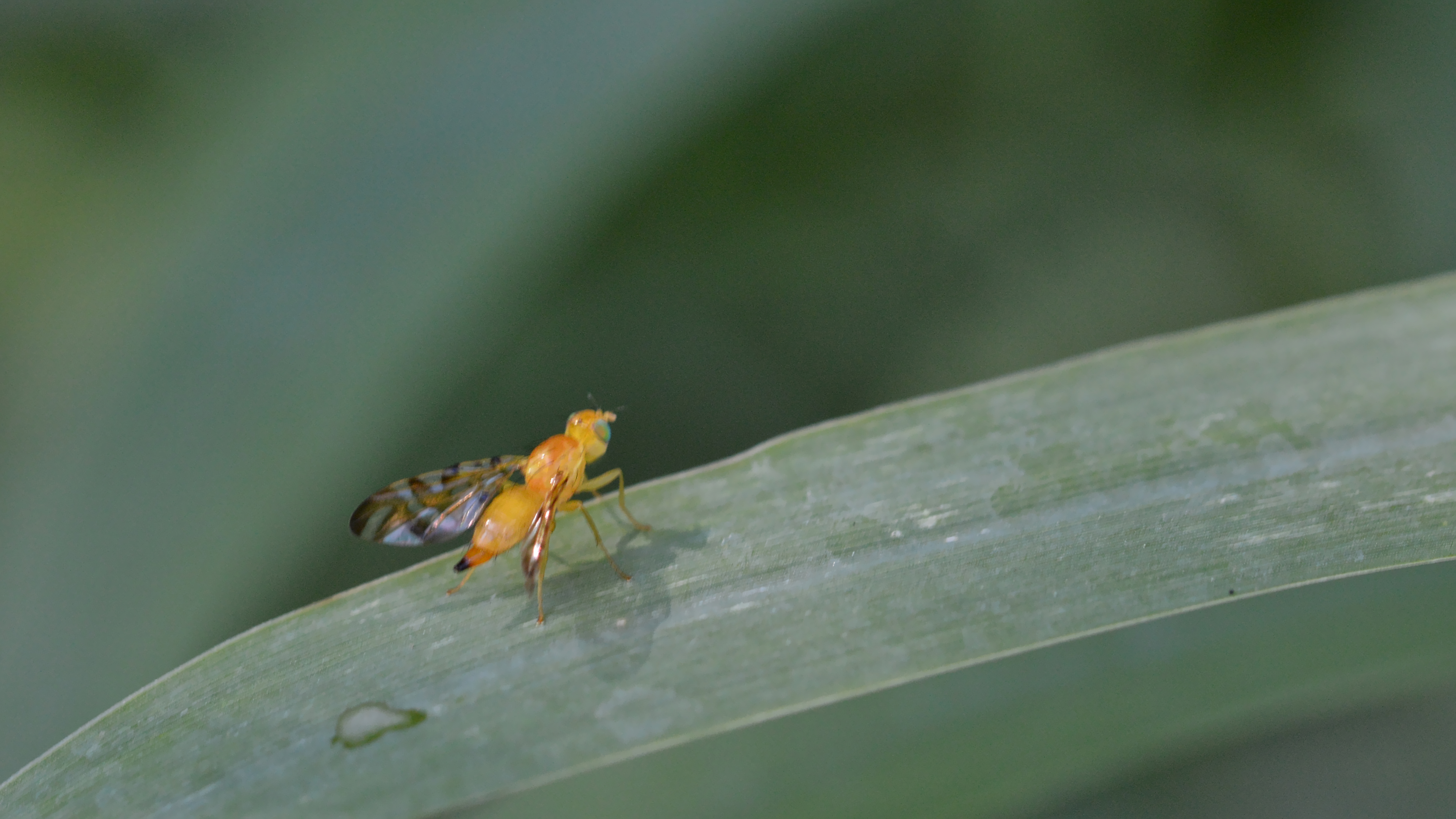

Scientific classification
- Domain: Eukaryota
- Kingdom: Animalia
- Phylum: Arthropoda
- Class: Insecta
- Order: Diptera
- Family: Tephritidae
- Genus: Strauzia
- Species: S. perfecta

Binomial name
- Strauzia perfecta (Loew, 1873)

= Strauzia perfecta =

Species of fly

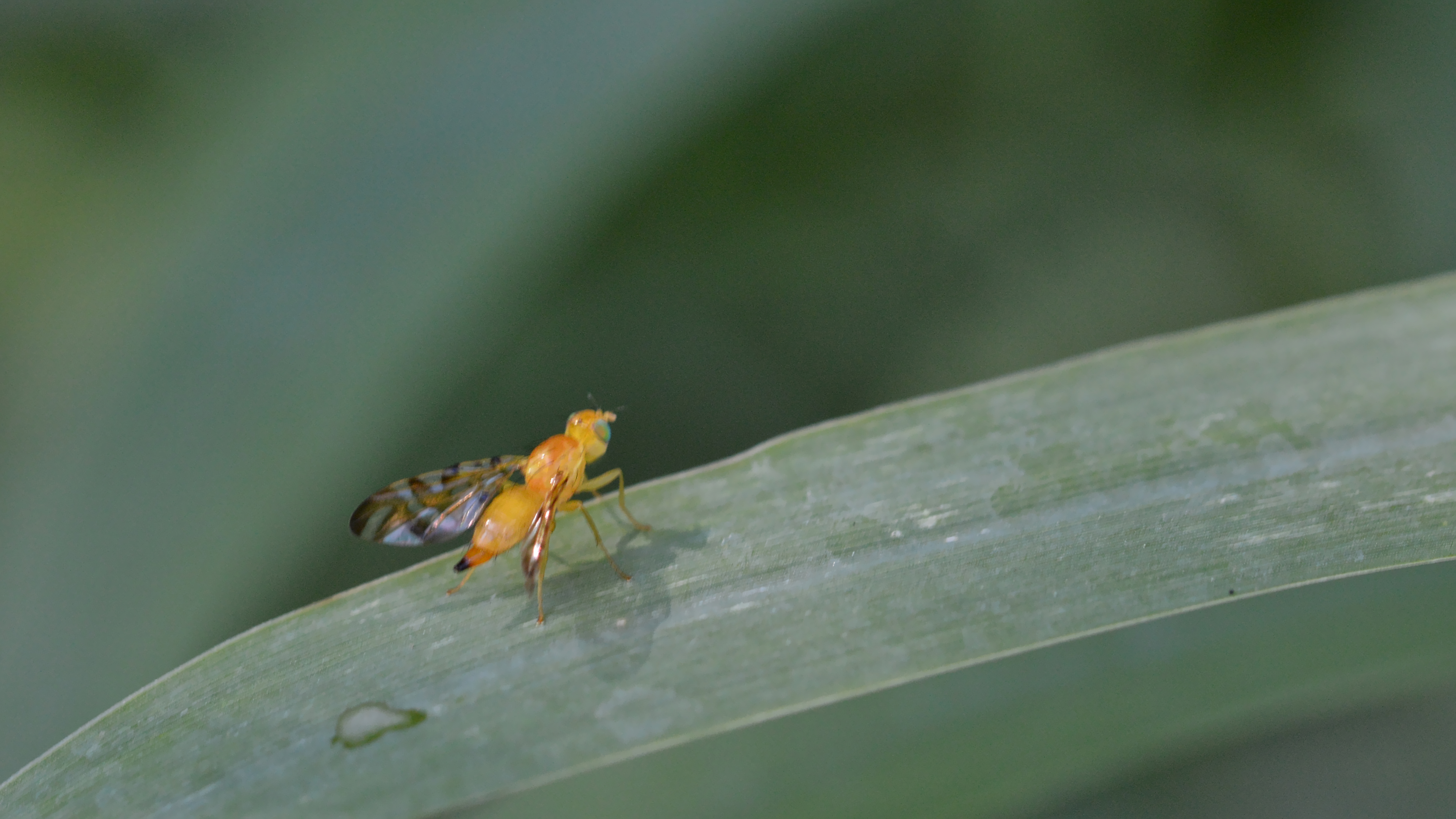

Strauzia perfecta is a species of tephritid or fruit flies in the genus Strauzia of the family Tephritidae.
