= Euaresta bullans =

Scientific classification
- Kingdom: Animalia
- Phylum: Arthropoda
- Class: Insecta
- Order: Diptera
- Family: Tephritidae
- Subfamily: Tephritinae
- Tribe: Tephritini
- Genus: Euaresta
- Species: E. bullans

Binomial name
- Euaresta bullans (Wiedemann, 1830)

Synonyms
- Trypeta bullans Wiedemann, 1830; Camaromyia bullanns Aczél, 1950; Tephritis wolffi Cresson, 1931; Euaresta adspersa Coquillett, 1904; Tephritis meleagris Schiner, 1868; Trypeta tenera Loew, 1850; Acinia rufa Macquart, 1843

Species of fly

Euaresta bullans is a species of fruit fly in the genus Euaresta of the family Tephritidae.

== Distribution ==
Peru, Chile, Argentina, Uruguay. Introduced to: California, Arizona, South Europe, Middle East, South Africa, Australia.
