= Euaresta reticulata =

Scientific classification
- Kingdom: Animalia
- Phylum: Arthropoda
- Class: Insecta
- Order: Diptera
- Family: Tephritidae
- Subfamily: Tephritinae
- Tribe: Tephritini
- Genus: Euaresta
- Species: E. reticulata

Binomial name
- Euaresta reticulata (Hendel, 1914)

Synonyms
- Trypanea reticulata Hendel, 1914; Tephritis apicata Becker, 1919

Species of fly

Euaresta reticulata is a species of fruit fly in the genus Euaresta of the family Tephritidae.

== Distribution ==
Colombia, Ecuador, Peru, Bolivia.
