= Euaresta jonesi =

Scientific classification
- Kingdom: Animalia
- Phylum: Arthropoda
- Class: Insecta
- Order: Diptera
- Family: Tephritidae
- Subfamily: Tephritinae
- Tribe: Tephritini
- Genus: Euaresta
- Species: E. jonesi

Binomial name
- Euaresta jonesi (Curran, 1932)

Synonyms
- Trypeta jonesi Curran, 1932; Trypeta microstigma Curran, 1932

Species of fly

Euaresta jonesi is a species of fruit fly in the genus Euaresta of the family Tephritidae.
