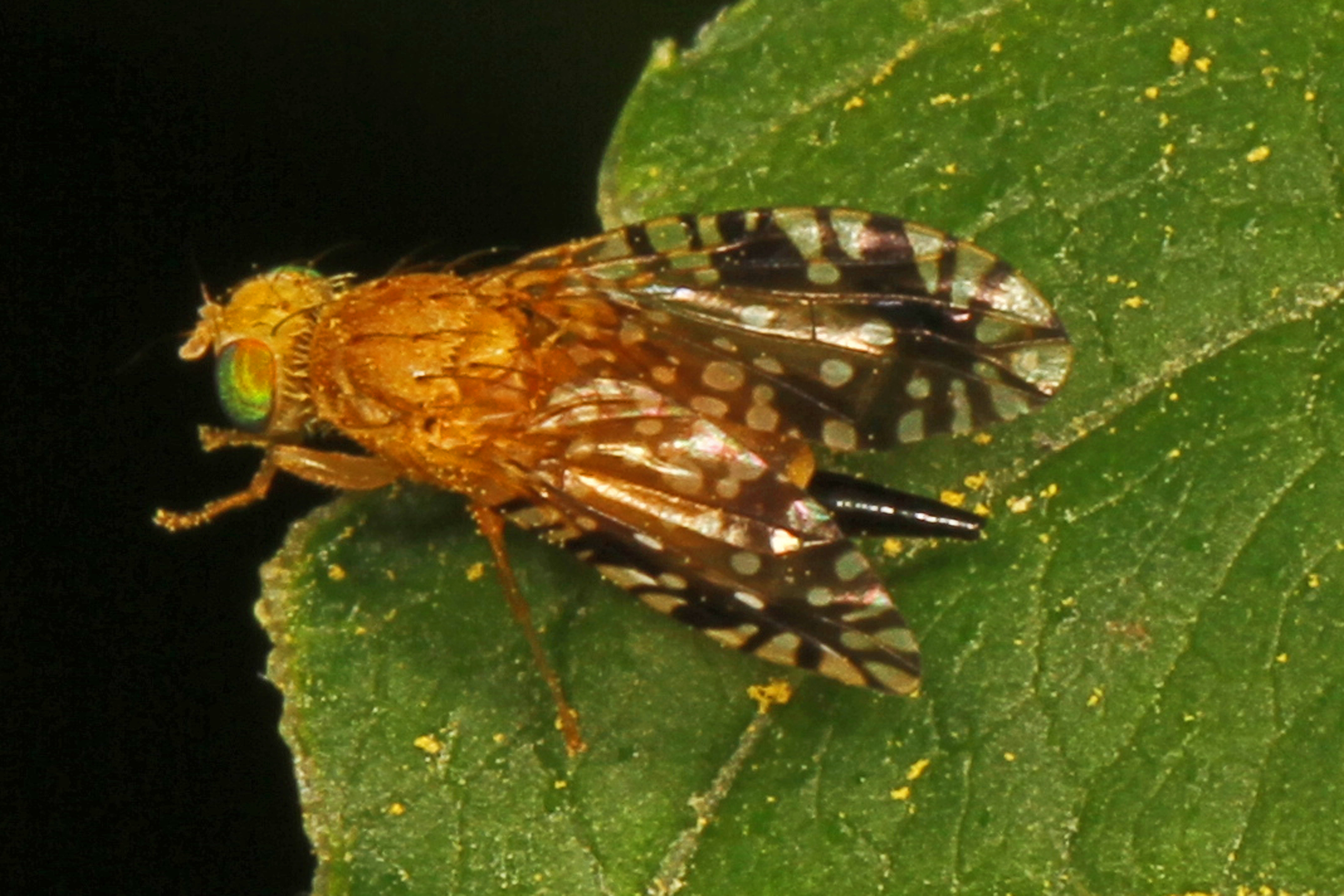
- Euaresta festiva

Scientific classification
- Kingdom: Animalia
- Phylum: Arthropoda
- Class: Insecta
- Order: Diptera
- Family: Tephritidae
- Subfamily: Tephritinae
- Tribe: Tephritini
- Genus: Euaresta
- Species: E. festiva

Binomial name
- Euaresta festiva (Loew, 1862)

Synonyms
- Trypeta festiva Loew, 1862

= Euaresta festiva =

Species of fly

Euaresta festiva is a species of fruit fly in the family Tephritidae.
