= Ceratodacus =

Scientific classification
- Domain: Eukaryota
- Kingdom: Animalia
- Phylum: Arthropoda
- Class: Insecta
- Order: Diptera
- Family: Tephritidae
- Subfamily: Blepharoneurinae
- Genus: Ceratodacus; Hendel, 1914

Type species
- Ceratodacus longicornis Hendel, 1914

Genus of flies

Ceratodacus is a genus of tephritid fruitfly. The type species Ceratodacus longicornis is found in South America in Brazil, Guyana and Peru. Nothing is known about its host plant. A second species, Ceratodacus priscus Norrbom & Condon, 2000 has been described from Dominican amber (Upper Eocene, age estimates vary widely from 15 to 45 million years).
