= Baryglossa =

Scientific classification
- Kingdom: Animalia
- Phylum: Arthropoda
- Clade: Pancrustacea
- Class: Insecta
- Order: Diptera
- Family: Tephritidae
- Subfamily: Blepharoneurinae
- Genus: Baryglossa; Bezzi, 1918

Genus of flies

Baryglossa is a genus of tephritid or fruit flies in the family Tephritidae.

== Species ==
- Baryglossa bequaerti Bezzi, 1924
- Baryglossa emorsa Munro, 1957
- Baryglossa histrio Bezzi, 1918
- Baryglossa mimella Munro, 1957
- Baryglossa oldroydi Munro, 1957
- Baryglossa tersa Munro, 1939
- Baryglossa trulla Munro, 1957
