= Baryglossa bequaerti =

Scientific classification
- Kingdom: Animalia
- Phylum: Arthropoda
- Clade: Pancrustacea
- Class: Insecta
- Order: Diptera
- Family: Tephritidae
- Genus: Baryglossa
- Species: B. bequaerti

Binomial name
- Baryglossa bequaerti Bezzi, 1924

Species of fly

Baryglossa bequaerti is a species of tephritid or fruit flies in the genus Baryglossa of the family Tephritidae.
