= Euaresta philodema =

Scientific classification
- Kingdom: Animalia
- Phylum: Arthropoda
- Class: Insecta
- Order: Diptera
- Family: Tephritidae
- Subfamily: Tephritinae
- Tribe: Tephritini
- Genus: Euaresta
- Species: E. philodema

Binomial name
- Euaresta philodema (Hendel, 1914)

Synonyms
- Camaromyia philodema Hendel, 1914

Species of fly

Euaresta philodema is a species of fruit fly in the genus Euaresta of the family Tephritidae.

== Distribution ==
Chile
