= Euaresta regularis =

Scientific classification
- Kingdom: Animalia
- Phylum: Arthropoda
- Class: Insecta
- Order: Diptera
- Family: Tephritidae
- Subfamily: Tephritinae
- Tribe: Tephritini
- Genus: Euaresta
- Species: E. regularis

Binomial name
- Euaresta regularis Norrbom, 1993

Species of fly

Euaresta regularis is a species of fruit fly in the genus Euaresta of the family Tephritidae.

== Distribution ==
Brazil.
