= Blepharoneura biseriata =

Scientific classification
- Kingdom: Animalia
- Phylum: Arthropoda
- Class: Insecta
- Order: Diptera
- Family: Tephritidae
- Genus: Blepharoneura
- Species: B. biseriata

Binomial name
- Blepharoneura biseriata Wulp, 1899

Synonyms
- Blepharoneura btseriata Aczel, 1950

Species of fly

Blepharoneura biseriata is a species of tephritid or fruit flies in the genus Blepharoneura of the family Tephritidae.

== Distribution ==
Mexico
