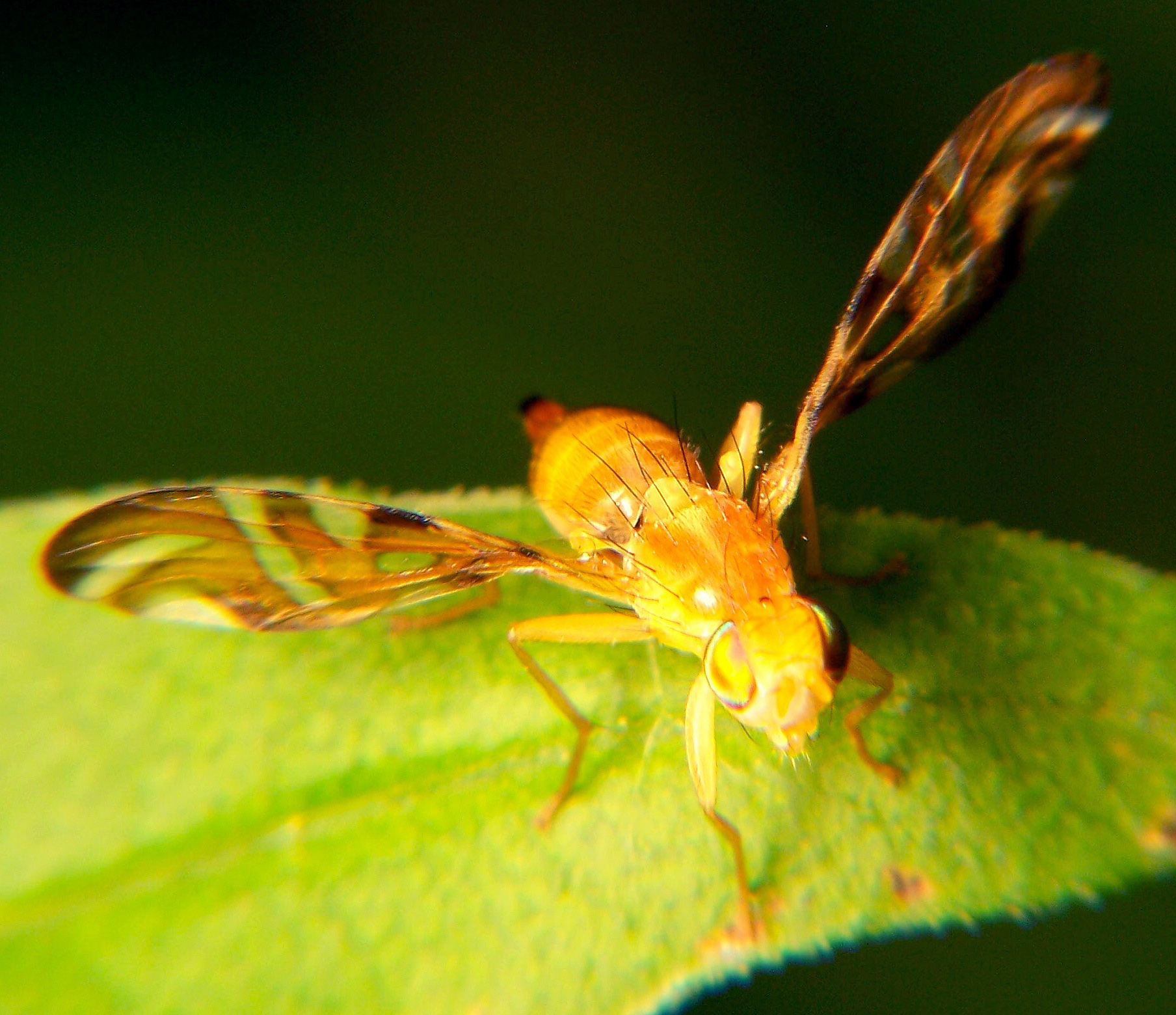
- Strauzia longipennis (Sunflower maggot)

Scientific classification
- Domain: Eukaryota
- Kingdom: Animalia
- Phylum: Arthropoda
- Class: Insecta
- Order: Diptera
- Family: Tephritidae
- Subfamily: Trypetinae
- Tribe: Trypetini
- Genus: Strauzia; Robineau-Desvoidy, 1830

Species
- See text

= Strauzia =

Genus of flies

Strauzia is a genus of tephritid or fruit flies in the family Tephritidae.

== Species ==
- Strauzia arculata (Loew, 1873)
- Strauzia bushi Lisowski, 1986
- Strauzia gigantei Steyskal, 1986
- Strauzia intermedia (Loew, 1873)
- Strauzia longipennis (Wiedemann, 1830) – Sunflower maggot
- Strauzia longitudinalis (Loew, 1873)
- Strauzia noctipennis Stoltzfus, 1988
- Strauzia perfecta (Loew, 1873)
- Strauzia rugosa Stoltzfus, 1988
- Strauzia stoltzfusi Steyskal, 1986
- Strauzia uvedaliae Stoltzfus, 1988
- Strauzia verbesinae Steyskal, 1986
- Strauzia vittigera (Loew, 1873)
