= Problepharoneura =

Scientific classification
- Domain: Eukaryota
- Kingdom: Animalia
- Phylum: Arthropoda
- Class: Insecta
- Order: Diptera
- Family: Tephritidae
- Genus: †Problepharoneura; Norrbom & Condon, 2000
- Species: †P. antiqua

Binomial name
- †Problepharoneura antiqua Norrbom & Condon, 2000

Genus of flies

Problepharoneura is a fossil genus of Tephritid or fruit flies in the family Tephritidae for the sole species, Problepharoneura antiqua, described on the basis of single male specimen found in Upper Eocene amber from the Dominican Republic.
