= Strauzia intermedia =

Scientific classification
- Domain: Eukaryota
- Kingdom: Animalia
- Phylum: Arthropoda
- Class: Insecta
- Order: Diptera
- Family: Tephritidae
- Genus: Strauzia
- Species: S. intermedia

Binomial name
- Strauzia intermedia (Loew, 1873)

Species of fly

Strauzia intermedia is a species of tephritid or fruit flies in the genus Strauzia of the family Tephritidae. It develops in Rudbeckia laciniata.
