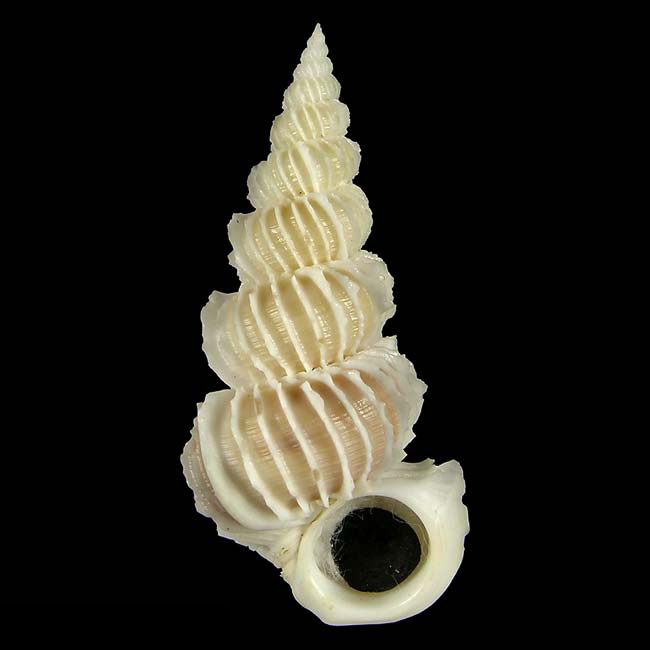

Scientific classification
- Kingdom: Animalia
- Phylum: Mollusca
- Class: Gastropoda
- Subclass: Caenogastropoda
- Order: incertae sedis
- Family: Epitoniidae
- Genus: Cirsotrema
- Species: C. browni

Binomial name
- Cirsotrema browni Poppe, 2008

= Cirsotrema browni =

Species of gastropod

Cirsotrema browni is a species of sea snail, a marine gastropoda mollusk in the family Epitoniidae.

== Original description ==
- Poppe G.T. (2008) New Fissurellidae, Epitoniidae, Aclididae, Mitridae and Costellariidae from the Philippines. Visaya 2(3): 37-63. [Published August 2008].
