= Tephritid Workers Database =

Tephritid Workers Database logo

The Tephritid Workers Database is a web-based database for sharing information on tephritid fruit flies. Because these species are one of the most economically important group of insect species that threaten fruit and vegetable production and trade worldwide, a tremendous amount of information is made available each year: new technologies developed, new information on their biology and ecology; new control methods made available, new species identified, new outbreaks recorded and new operational control programmes launched. The TWD allows workers to keep up-to-date on the most recent developments and provides an easily accessible and always available resource.

== History ==
A group of scientists involved in tephritid fruit fly research and management launched the Tephritid Workers Database in May 2004, with the support of the Insect Pest Control Section of the Joint FAO/IAEA Centre. The Tephritid Workers Database is self-maintained by the participants and its development depends on the active contribution of the members.

The TWD database has now more than 1000 members from more than 100 countries and is sponsoring or hosting websites of other regional fruit fly working groups:

- The Tephritid Workers of Europe Africa and the Middle East (TEAM)
- The Tephritid Workers of the Western Hemisphere (TWWH)
- The Tephritid Workers of Asia Australia and Oceania (TAAO)

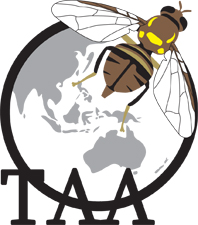
The regional Tephritid workers of Asia Australia and Oceania

== Fruit Fly News ==
In the past, an information service for the tephritid fruit fly workers called FRUIT FLY NEWS (FFN) was issued annually under the auspices of the International Biological Program and then under the International Organisation of Biological Control (IOBC). This newsletter publication was interrupted in 1992 and then resumed in an electronic format since 2009. The first issues tell all the story about the creation of FFN and the Working Group on Fruit Flies (WGFF).

- International Biological Program (IBP) Fruit Fly News n°1 (1972)
- Fruit Fly News n°2 (1973)
- IBP Fruit Fly News n°3 (1974)
- IOBC/WPRS WG Rhagoletis cerasi Fruit Fly News n°4 (1977)
- IOBC/WPRS WG Fruit Flies of Economic Importance Fruit Fly News n°5 (1979)
- IOBC/WPRS WG Fruit Flies of Economic Importance Fruit Fly News n°6 (1981)
- FFN #7_1983
- FFN #8_1985
- FFN #9_1987
- FFN #10_1989
- FFN #11_1992

Follow the link to get all Fruit Fly News issues.

== Insect Pest Control Newsletters ==
- IPC newsletters

== Tephritid Workers of Europe Africa and the Middle East Newsletters ==
- TEAM newsletters

== Tephritid Workers of Asia Australia and Oceania Newsletters ==
- TAAO newsletters

== Previous Symposia of the International Fruit Fly Workers ==
Initiated in 1982 at the First International Symposium held in Athens, the quadrennial fruit fly symposium for the international fruit fly workers is well established now with a large number of scientists from all over the world attending the symposium.

- The First International Symposium on Fruit Flies of Economic Importance, Athens, Greece, 16–19 November 1982Proceedings
- The Second International Symposium on Fruit Flies of Economic Importance, Crete, Greece, 16–21 September 1986Proceedings
- The Third International Symposium on Fruit Flies of Economic Importance, Antigua, Guatemala, 14–20 October 1990Book presentation
- The Fourth International Symposium on Fruit Flies of Economic Importance, Sand Key, Florida, USA, 5–10 June 1994Book presentation)
- The Fifth International Symposium on Fruit Flies of Economic Importance, Penang, Malaysia, 1–5 June 1998Proceedings
- The Sixth International Symposium on Fruit Flies of Economic Importance, Stellenbosch, South Africa, 6–10 May 2002 Proceedings
- The Seventh International Symposium on Fruit Flies of Economic Importance, Salvador, Bahia, Brazil, 10–15 September 2006. Proceedings.
- The Eight International Symposium on Fruit Flies of Economic Importance, Valencia, Spain, 26 September–1 October 2010. Proceedings
- The Ninth International Symposium on Fruit Flies of Economic Importance, Bangkok, Thailand, 12 to 16 May 2014. Book of Abstracts Proceedings
- The Tenth International Symposium on Fruit Flies of Economic Importance, Tapachula, Chiapas, Mexico, 23 to 27 April 2018. (website)

== Tephritid Fruit Flies of Economic Importance ==
According to White & Elson-Harris (1992), there are about 70 species of fruit flies that are considered important agricultural pests. See The Diptera Site for full information. Bactrocera, Anastrepha, Ceratitis, Rhagoletis, and Dacus are the most important genera. The most important pest species of Tephritidae are:

- Bactrocera dorsalis

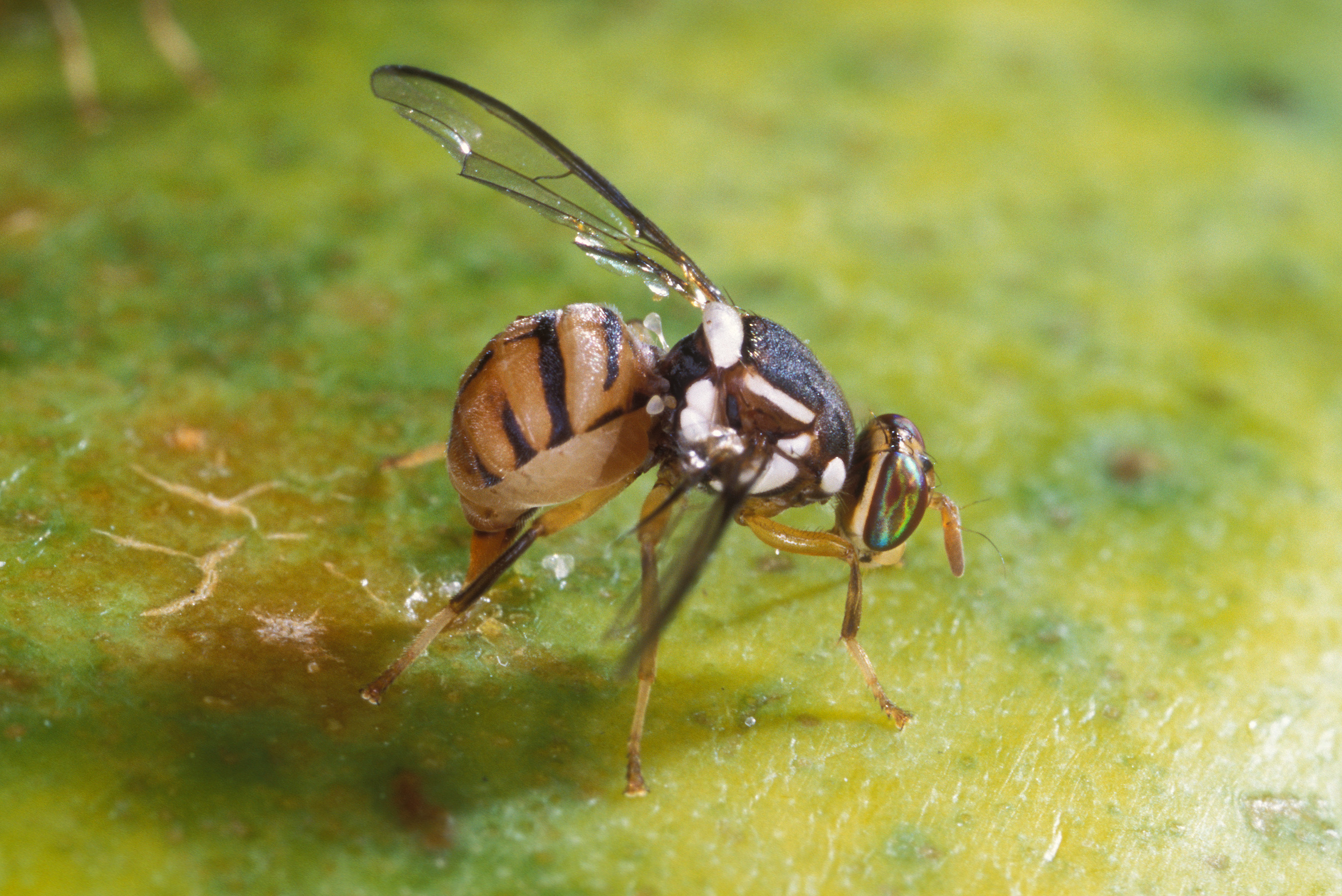
Bactrocera dorsalis-complex (Ph.credit S. Bauer, USDA)

- Bactrocera cucurbitae

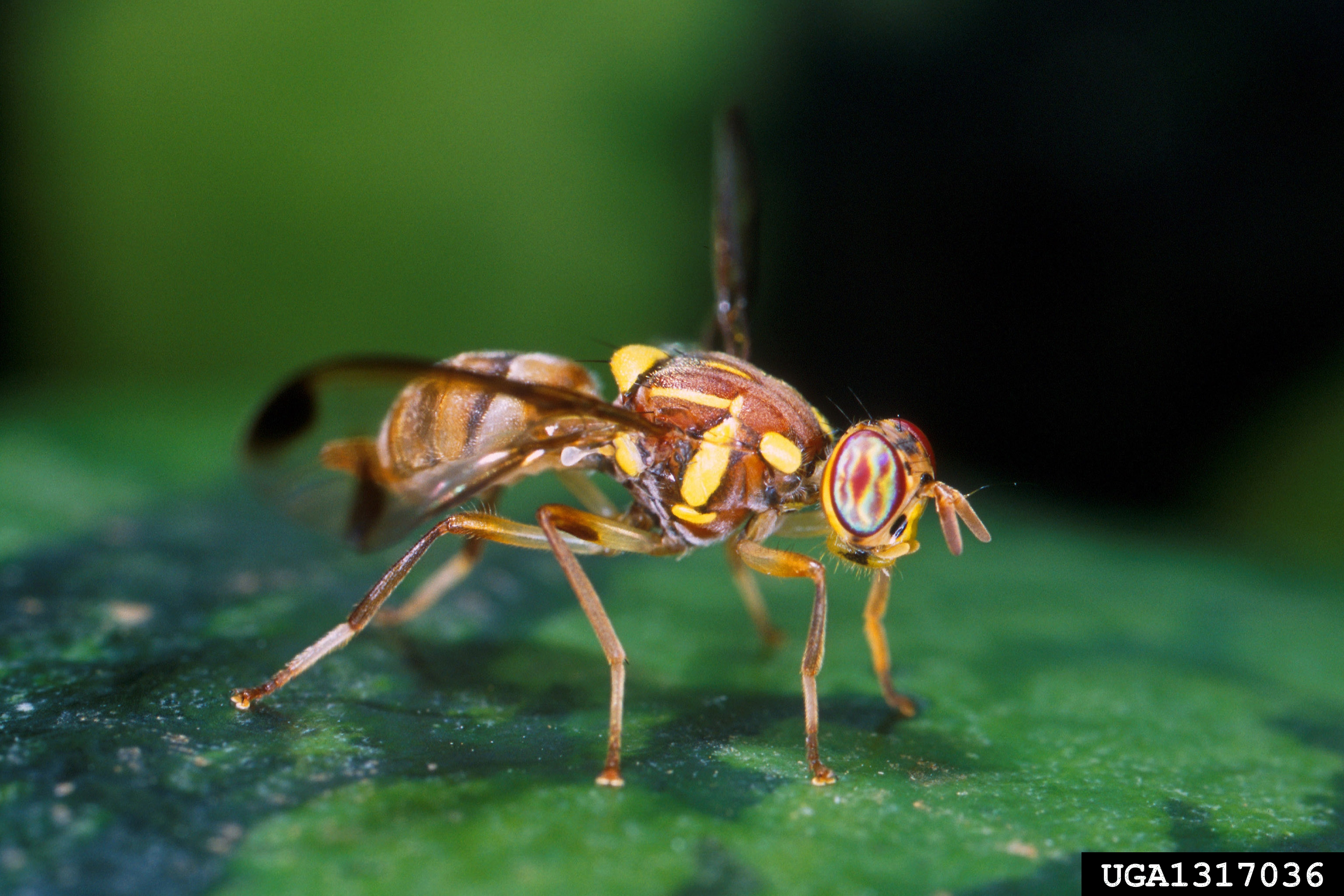
Bactrocera cucurbitae (Ph.credit S. Bauer, USDA)

- Bactrocera oleae

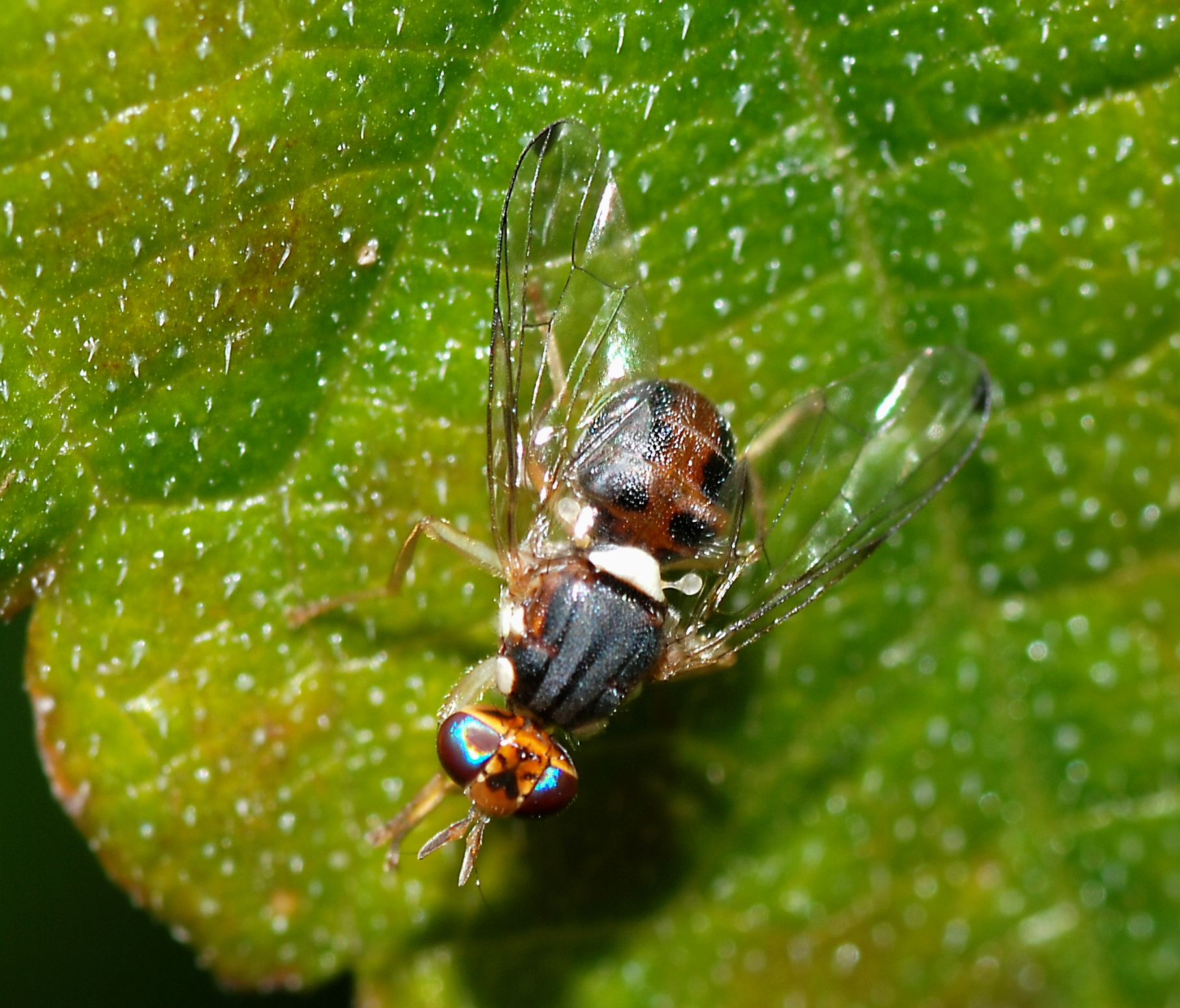
Bcatrocera oleae (Ph.credit Alves Gaspar)

- Bactrocera tryoni

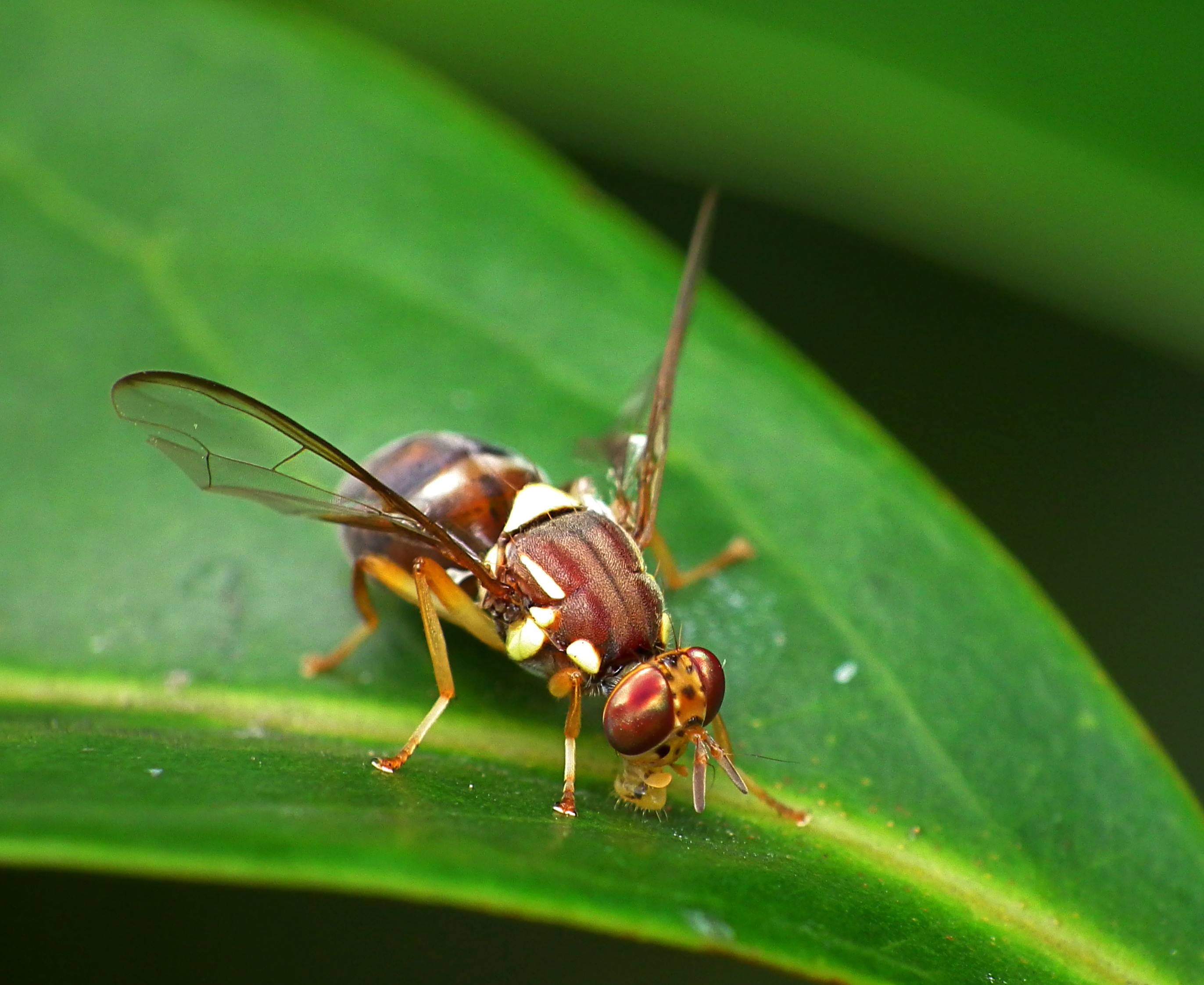
Bactrocera tryoni (Ph.credit J. Niland, Australia)

- Bactrocera zonata
- Bactrocera invadens
- Ceratitis capitata (Distribution map)
- Anastrepha fraterculus
- Anastrepha ludens
- Anastrepha obliqua
- Rhagoletis pomonella
- Rhagoletis cerasi
- Dacus ciliatus
