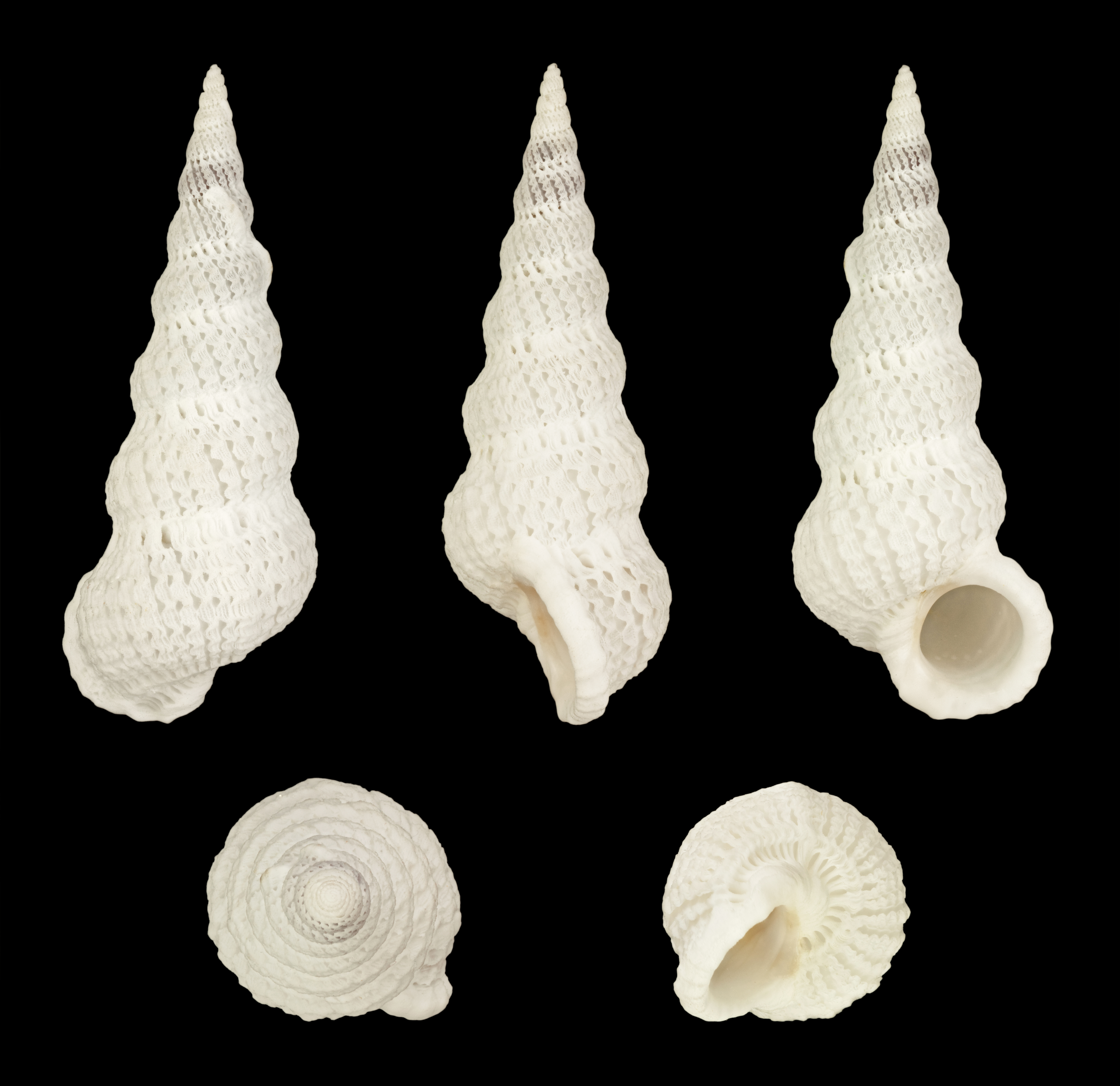
- Shell of Cirsotrema varicosum (Lamarck, 1822)

Scientific classification
- Kingdom: Animalia
- Phylum: Mollusca
- Class: Gastropoda
- Subclass: Caenogastropoda
- Order: incertae sedis
- Superfamily: Epitonioidea
- Family: Epitoniidae
- Genus: Cirsotrema; Mörch, 1852

Type species
- Scalaria varicosa Lamarck, 1822

Species
- See text

Synonyms
- Caloscala Tate, 1885; Cirsotremma (Spelling variation); Cirsotrema (Circuloscala) De Boury, 1886 †· accepted, alternate representation; Cirsotrema (Cirsotrema) Mörch, 1852; Cirsotrema (Coroniscala) de Boury, 1909 †· accepted, alternate representation; Cirsotrema (Tioria) Marwick, 1928 †· accepted, alternate representation; Cirsotremopsis Thiele, 1928; Coroniscala de Boury, 1909 †; Dannevigena Iredale, 1936; Elegantiscala de Boury, 1911 †; Laniscala Lan, 1976; Mammiscala de Boury, 1909; Rectacirsa Iredale, 1936; Scala (Cirsotrema) Mörch, 1852; Scala (Coroniscala) de Boury, 1909 †; Scala (Elegantiscala) de Boury, 1911; Scala (Mammiscala) de Boury, 1909 †; Scalaria (Cirsotrema) Mörch, 1852; Tioria Marwick, 1928 †

= Cirsotrema =

Genus of gastropods

Cirsostrema is a genus of very small deepwater sea snails, marine gastropod mollusks in the family Epitoniidae, commonly known as the wentletraps.

The type species of the family is Scalaria varicosa Lamarck, 1822.

== Species ==
- Cirsotrema amamiense Nakayama, 2000
- Cirsotrema amplsum Nakayama, 2000
- † Cirsotrema angulatum Marwick, 1926
- Cirsotrema benettorum Garcia, 2000
- Cirsotrema bonum J.C. Melvill, 1906
- Cirsotrema browni Poppe, 2008
- † Cirsotrema caelicola Finlay, 1926
- Cirsotrema canephorum J.C. Melvill, 1906
- † Cirsotrema chathamense Marwick, 1928
- Cirsotrema cloveri Brown, 2002
- † Cirsotrema coronale (Deshayes, 1861)
- Cirsotrema cribaria A. Adams, 1861 (species inquirenda)
- Cirsotrema ctenodentatum Zelaya & Güller, 2017
- Cirsotrema dalli Rehder, 1945
- Cirsotrema edgari (DeBoury, 1912)
- † Cirsotrema elegantissimum (Deshayes, 1861)
- Cirsotrema ernestoilaoi Garcia E., 2001
- Cirsotrema excelsum Garcia, 2003
- Cirsotrema fimbriatulum P. Masahito, T. Kuroda & T. Habe, 1971
- Cirsotrema fimbriolatum (Melvill, 1897)
- † Cirsotrema firmatum Laws, 1939
- Cirsotrema fregata (Iredale, 1936)
- Cirsotrema fusticulus (Monterosato, 1875)
- † Cirsotrema gagei P. A. Maxwell, 1978
- Cirsotrema georgeanum Zelaya & Güller, 2017
- Cirsotrema goodalliana
- Cirsotrema herosae Garcia, 2003
- Cirsotrema hertzae Garcia, 2010
- Cirsotrema intextum Bozzetti, 2007
- Cirsotrema kamiyanum T. Kuroda, 1946
- Cirsotrema krousma R.N. Kilburn, 1985
- † Cirsotrema kuriense Marwick, 1942
- † Cirsotrema lyratum (Zittel, 1865)
- Cirsotrema magellanicum (Philippi, 1845)
- †Cirsotrema marshalli Laws, 1935
- Cirsotrema martyr (Iredale, 1936)
- Cirsotrema matugisiense (Ozaki, 1958)
- Cirsotrema mituokai (Ozaki, 1958)
- Cirsotrema montrouzieri S. M. Souverbie, 1872
- † Cirsotrema parvulum Marwick, 1928
- Cirsotrema pilsbryi McGinty, 1940
- † Cirsotrema pleiophylla (Tate, 1890)
- Cirsotrema plexis Dall, 1925
- † Cirsotrema propelyratum Marwick, 1928
- Cirsotrema pumiceum (Brocchi, 1814)
- Cirsotrema rariforme Lamarck, 1822
- Cirsotrema richeri Garcia, 2003
- Cirsotrema rugosum (T. Kuroda & K. Ito, 1961)
- Cirsotrema skoglundae Garcia, 2010
- Cirsotrema strebeli Zelaya & Güller, 2017
- Cirsotrema texta E. A. Smith, 1903
- Cirsotrema togatum (L. G. Hertlein & A. M. Strong, 1951)
- Cirsotrema trabeculatum (A. Adams, 1861)
- Cirsotrema translucida (Gatliff, 1906)
- Cirsotrema turbonilla A. Adams, 1861
- Cirsotrema turriculoides Yokoyama, 1920
- Cirsotrema validum (Verco, 1906)
- Cirsotrema varicosum (Lamarck, 1822)
- Cirsotrema vulpinum (R. B. Hinds, 1844)
- † Cirsotrema youngi Marwick, 1928
- Cirsotrema zelebori (Dunker, 1866)
- † Cirsotrema zitteli P. A. Maxwell, 1992
- Cirsotrema zografakisi Poppe, Tagaro & Brown, 2006

Species brought into synonymy

- Cirsotrema abbreviatum (G. B. Sowerby II, 1874): synonym of Cirsotrema varicosum (Lamarck, 1822)
- Cirsotrema arcella Rehder, 1945: synonym of Cirsotrema dalli Rehder, 1945
- Cirsotrema attenuata Pease, 1860: synonym of Opalia bicarinata (G. B. Sowerby II, 1844)
- Cirsotrema attenuatum Pease, 1860: synonym of Opalia attenuata (Pease, 1860)
- Cirsotrema bavayi DeBoury, 1913 : synonym of Cirsotrema varicosum (Lamarck, 1822)
- Cirsotrema benettorum [sic]: synonym of Cirsotrema bennettorum Garcia, 2000
- Cirsotrema cochlea (Sowerby G.B. II,1844): synonym of Cirsotrema pumiceum (Brocchi, 1814)
- Cirsotrema crassilabrum (G. B. Sowerby, 1844): synonym of Opalia crassilabrum (Sowerby, 1844)
- Cirsotrema douvillei Fenoux, 1937: synonym of Epitonium magellanicum (Philippi, 1845)
- Cirsotrema eximia (A. Adams & Reeve, 1850): synonym of Epitonium eximium (A. Adams & Reeve, 1850)
- Cirsotrema fimbriata Kuroda & Habe, 1954: synonym of Cirsotrema fimbriatulum (Masahito, Kuroda & Habe, 1971)
- Cirsotrema forresti Dell, 1956 : synonym of Cirsotrema zelebori (Dunker, 1866)
- Cirsotrema fragilis (Hanley, 1840), sensu Azuma, 1960: synonym of Epitonium tosaense (Azuma, 1962)
- Cirsotrema funiculata Carpenter, 1857: synonym of Opalia funiculata (Carpenter, 1857)
- Cirsotrema greenlandicum (Perry, 1811): synonym of Boreoscala greenlandica (Perry, 1811)
- Cirsotrema hidryma J. C. Melvill, 1899 : synonym of Opalia hidryma (Melvill, 1899)
- Cirsotrema invalida Verco, 1906 : synonym of Plastiscala invalida (Verco, 1906)
- Cirsotrema jolyi (Monterosato, 1878): synonym of Epitonium jolyi (Monterosato, 1878)
- Cirsotrema joubini (de Boury, 1913): synonym of Cirsotrema varicosum (Lamarck, 1822)
- Cirsotrema kagayai T. Habe & Ito, 1965: synonym of Cirsotrema mituokai (Ozaki, 1958)
- Cirsotrema kelea Iredale, 1930: synonym of Variciscala raricostata (Lamarck, 1822)
- Cirsotrema kieneri C. E. Tapparone-Canefri, 1876: synonym of Amaea arabica (Nyst, 1871)
- Cirsotrema kuroharai Kuroda in Azuma, 1960: synonym of Claviscala kuroharai Kuroda in Azuma, 1960
- Cirsotrema magellanica (Philippi, 1845): synonym of Epitonium magellanicum (Philippi, 1845)
- Cirsotrema mammosa (Melvill & Standen, 1903): synonym of Opalia mammosa (Melvill & Standen, 1903)
- Cirsotrema montereyensis (Dall, 1907): synonym of Opalia montereyensis (Dall, 1907)
- Cirsotrema morchi G. F. Angas, 1871 : synonym of Plastiscala morchi (Angas, 1871)
  - Cirsotrema morchi profundior Iredale, 1936: synonym of Plastiscala morchi profundior Iredale, 1936
- Cirsotrema multiperforatum Sowerby, 1874 : synonym of Cirsotrema varicosum (Lamarck, 1822)
- Cirsotrema obtusicostata (G.O. Sars, 1878): synonym of Acirsa coarctata (Jeffreys, 1884)
- Cirsotrema pallaryi de Boury, 1912: synonym of Cirsotrema cochlea (G. B. Sowerby II, 1844)
- Cirsotrema peltei (Viader, 1938): synonym of Rectacirsa peltei (Viader, 1938)
- Cirsotrema pentidesmium S. S. Berry, 1963: synonym of Cirsotrema vulpinum (Hinds, 1844)
- Cirsotrema perplexa W. H. Pease, 1860 : synonym of Gyroscala lamellosa (Lamarck, 1822)
- Cirsotrema pumicea (Brocchi, 1814): synonym of Cirsotrema cochlea (G. B. Sowerby II, 1844)
- Cirsotrema reevei Clessin, 1897: synonym of Boreoscala zelebori (Dunker, 1866): synonym of Cirsotrema zelebori (Dunker, 1866)
- Cirsotrema soror Odhner, 1919: synonym of Opalia soror (Odhner, 1919)
- Cirsotrema suturalis R. B. Hinds, 1844 : synonym of Plastiscala suturalis (Hinds, 1843)
- Cirsotrema undulata Sowerby, 1844 : synonym of Acirsa borealis (Lyell, 1841)
