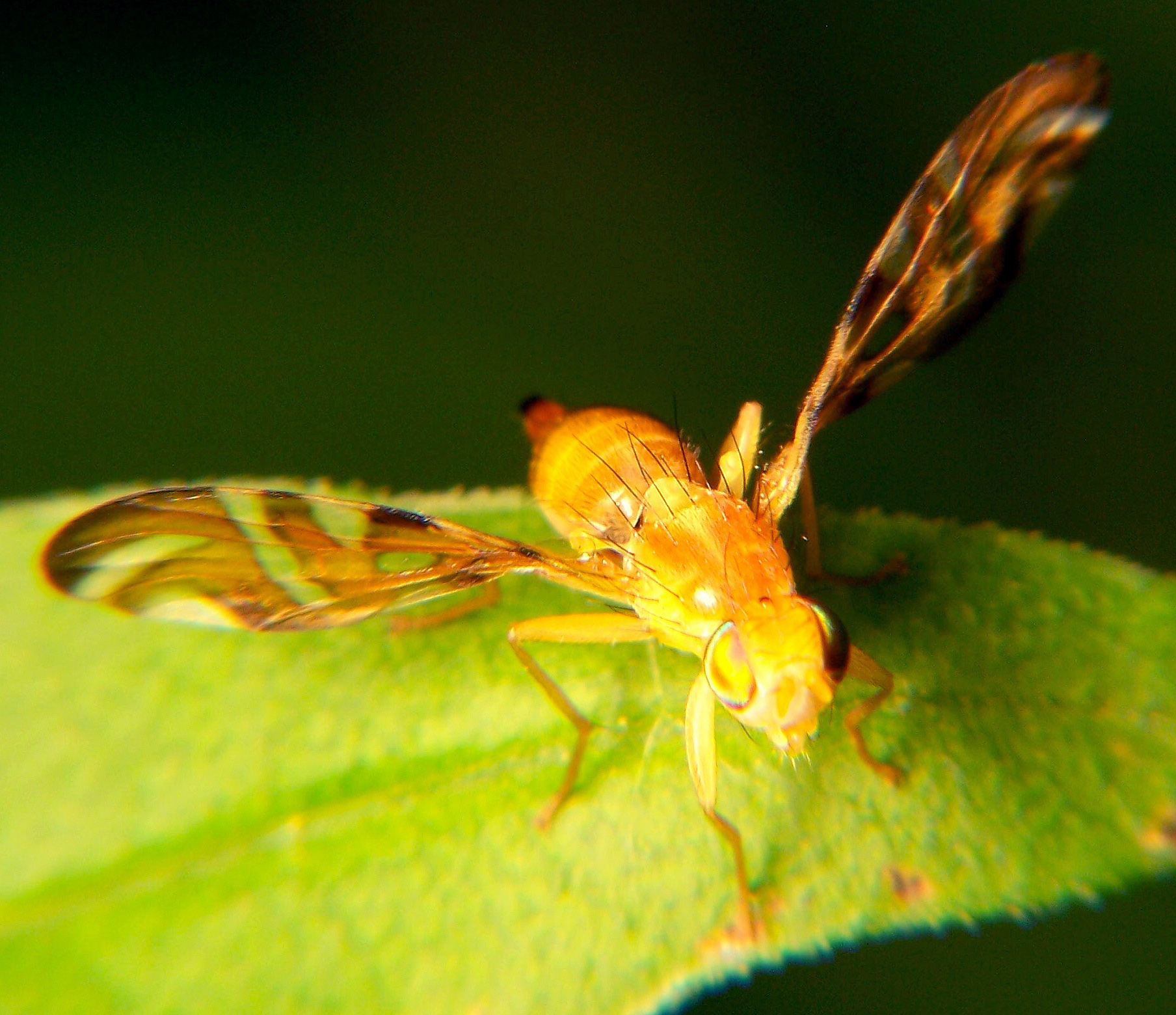

Scientific classification
- Domain: Eukaryota
- Kingdom: Animalia
- Phylum: Arthropoda
- Class: Insecta
- Order: Diptera
- Family: Tephritidae
- Genus: Strauzia
- Species: S. longipennis

Binomial name
- Strauzia longipennis (Wiedemann, 1830)

Synonyms
- Strauzia armata Robineau-Desvoidy, 1830; Strauzia inermis Robineau-Desvoidy, 1830; Tephritis trimaculata Macquart, 1843; Trypeta cornifera Walker, 1849; Trypeta cornigera Walker, 1849; Trypeta longipennis Wiedemann, 1830; Trypeta longipennis var. confluens Loew, 1873; Trypeta longipennis var. typica Loew, 1873; Trypeta sepentaria Harris, 1835; Trypeta septenaria Osten Sacken, 1858; Trypeta serpentaria Johnson, 1925

= Strauzia longipennis =

Species of fly

Strauzia longipennis is a large species of tephritid fruit fly known by the common name sunflower maggot. It is a minor pest whose larvae mine stems of sunflowers (Helianthus spp.). Damage from larval feeding on spongy tissue is usually light. The larvae do not damage the flower head or seeds, although those of other fruit fly species do so.

Adults are about 6 mm long and a wing length of approximately 7 mm. (reasonably large for a Tephritid) The body is yellow to orange and the wing has orange to brown bands, usually forming a distinct F-shaped marking near the wing tip. The larvae are yellowish-white in color reaching a length of about 5 mm and spend around 30 days feeding within the host plant before overwintering in the base of the plant or soil as pupae. Adults are found from May to August depending on location.

There are two other species of Tephritid fly species known as Sunflower Maggot, these are Gymnocarena diffusa which feeds in the flower head and Neotephritis finalis, the sunflower seed maggot, which feeds on the developing sunflower seeds.
