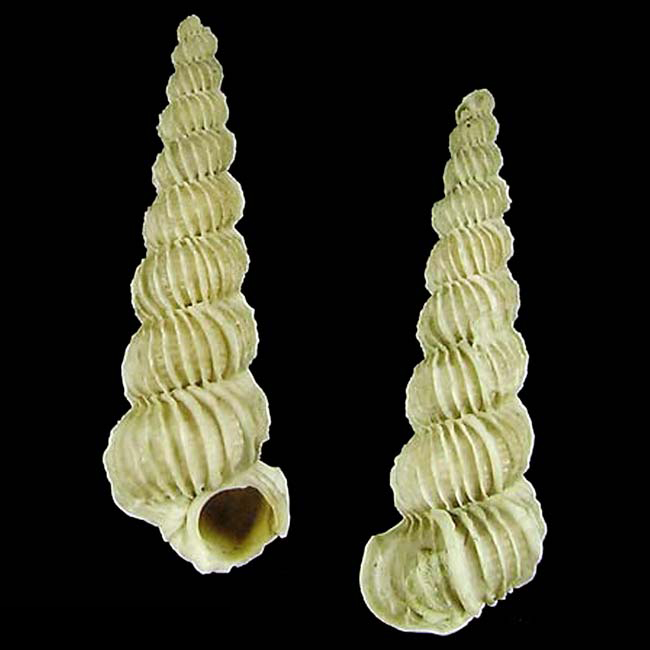

Scientific classification
- Kingdom: Animalia
- Phylum: Mollusca
- Class: Gastropoda
- Subclass: Caenogastropoda
- Order: incertae sedis
- Family: Epitoniidae
- Genus: Cirsotrema
- Species: C. zografakisi

Binomial name
- Cirsotrema zografakisi Poppe, Tagaro & Brown, 2006

= Cirsotrema zografakisi =

Species of gastropod

Cirsotrema zografakisi is a species of sea snail, a marine gastropoda mollusk in the family Epitoniidae.

== Original description ==
- Poppe G.T., Tagaro S.P. & Brown L. (2006) A new large Cirsotrema from Australia. Visaya 1(6): 35-37. [October 2006].
