= Ceratodacus priscus =

Scientific classification
- Domain: Eukaryota
- Kingdom: Animalia
- Phylum: Arthropoda
- Class: Insecta
- Order: Diptera
- Family: Tephritidae
- Genus: Ceratodacus
- Species: C. priscus

Binomial name
- Ceratodacus priscus Norrbom & Condon, 2000

Species of fly

Ceratodacus priscus is a species of prehistoric fly, which probably belongs in the family Tephritidae. It is known from a single male fossil, preserved in Dominican amber from the El Mamey Formation of the Cordillera Septentrional. The species is characterised by the presence of long setulae on the arista.
