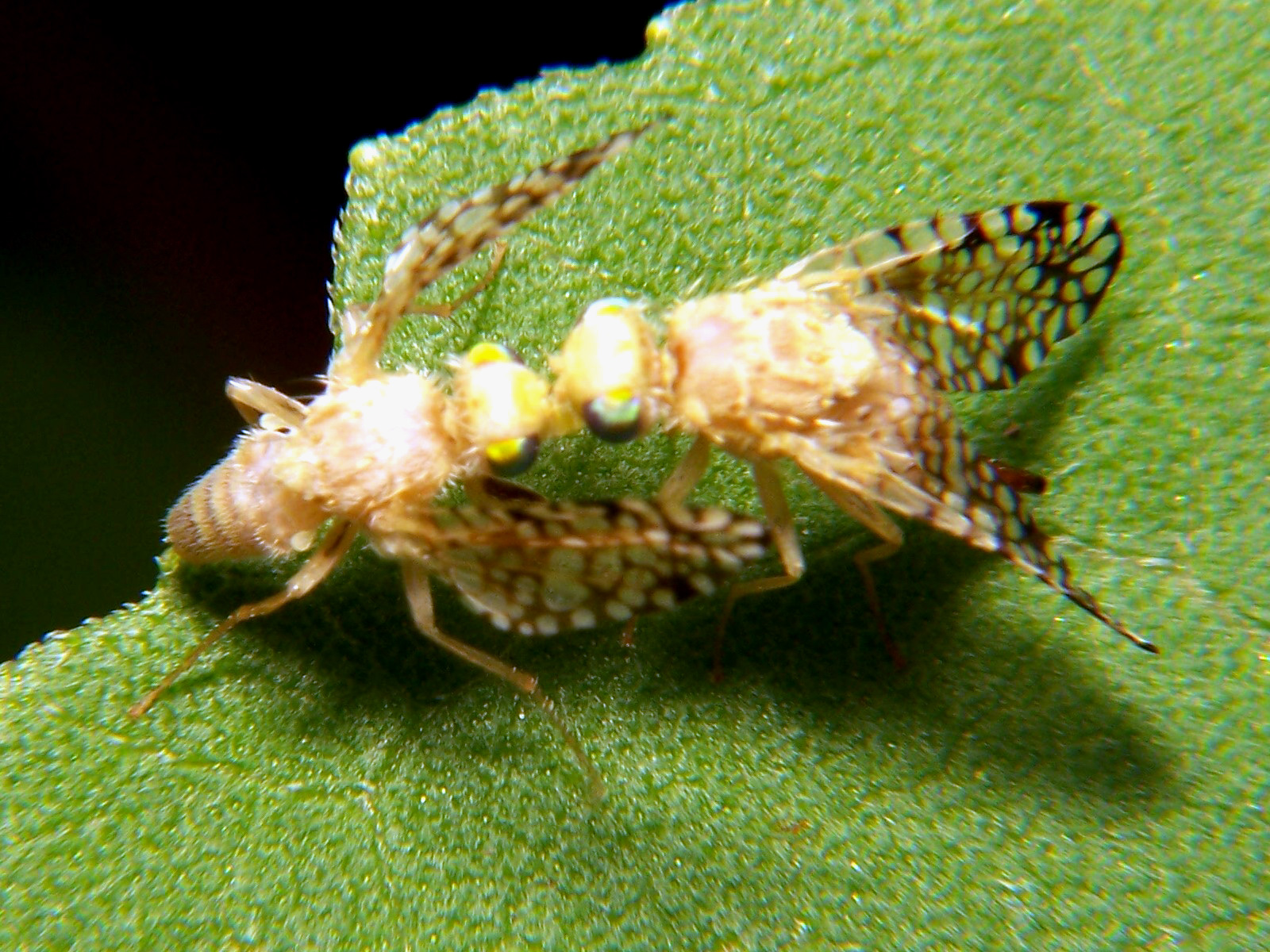
- Euaresta aequalis

Scientific classification
- Kingdom: Animalia
- Phylum: Arthropoda
- Class: Insecta
- Order: Diptera
- Family: Tephritidae
- Subfamily: Tephritinae
- Tribe: Tephritini
- Genus: Euaresta
- Species: E. aequalis

Binomial name
- Euaresta aequalis (Loew, 1862)

Synonyms
- Tephritis arcualis Foote, 1964; Tephritis gemella Coquillett, 1902; Trypeta aequalis Loew, 1862; Trypeta signalis Howard, 1901

= Euaresta aequalis =

Species of fly

Euaresta aequalis is a species of fruit fly in the genus Euaresta of the family Tephritidae.

== Description ==
E. aequalis has elaborate markings on its wings, characteristic of the family Tephritidae, and brilliant green eyes. The diagnostic characters for this species are a tan or yellow body with a clear round spot on the wing in cell r4+5, separated from the wing margin by distinct brown band. All North American species of the genus Euaresta except E. aequalis and festiva have a base color of dark brown to black. This species is generally the largest of the North American Euaresta. It is commonly known as the burr-seed fly.

== Distribution ==
E. aequalis is distributed widely across the United States and southern Canada. The species was first observed in Mexico in 1969, in Baja California. It was introduced to Australia in the 1930s in an attempt to control invasive cocklebur.

== Behavior ==
E. aequalis is a specialist—its only known host is the common or rough cocklebur, Xanthium strumarium. Females of this species have large ovipositors for laying eggs inside the hard burr capsule, which is protected by spines. The larva develops inside this capsule, feeding on one of the two seeds found in each burr. E. aequalis is univoltine, and its flight period is generally from mid-July to mid-August.

== Use in biological control ==
A variety of Xanthium known as Noogoora burr was introduced to Australia in the 1920s, likely imported from the southern United States. It quickly became a widespread problem, especially for the wool industry. The burrs would get stuck on sheep as they grazed and were very hard to remove. E. aequalis was identified as a possible candidate for biological control, along with two stem-boring beetles and a tortricid moth. E. aequalis was first released in Queensland in 1932. It was established at low levels and was not effective in controlling the burr, because the larvae typically only attack one of the two seeds in each fruit. Noogoora burr was eventually controlled by an accidentally introduced rust fungus.
