= Cirsotrema zelebori =

Scientific classification
- Kingdom: Animalia
- Phylum: Mollusca
- Class: Gastropoda
- Subclass: Caenogastropoda
- Order: incertae sedis
- Family: Epitoniidae
- Genus: Cirsotrema
- Species: C. zelebori

Binomial name
- Cirsotrema zelebori (Dunker, 1866)

Synonyms
- Boreoscala zelebori (Dunker, 1866); Cirsotrema forresti (Dell, 1956); Cirsotrema reevei Clessin, 1897; Epitonium (Asperiscala) forresti Dell, R.K.; Epitonium zelebori Frauenfeld, 1898; Scalaria intermedia Hutton, 1873; Scalaria zelebori Dunker, 1866; Tioria forresti Dell, 1956

Species of gastropod

Cirsotrema zelebori, common name : the slender wentletrap, is species of very small deepwater sea snail, a marine gastropod mollusk in the family Epitoniidae, the wentletraps.

== Description ==
The shell size varies between 12 mm and 25 mm.

== Distribution ==
This species is endemic to the seas off the southern islands of New Zealand.
