= Stigmella intermedia =

Scientific classification
- Kingdom: Animalia
- Phylum: Arthropoda
- Clade: Pancrustacea
- Class: Insecta
- Order: Lepidoptera
- Family: Nepticulidae
- Genus: Stigmella
- Species: S. intermedia

Binomial name
- Stigmella intermedia (Braun, 1917)

Synonyms
- Nepticula intermedia Braun, 1917

Species of moth

Stigmella intermedia is a moth of the family Nepticulidae. It is found in North America in Ohio, Arkansas, Kentucky and Ontario.

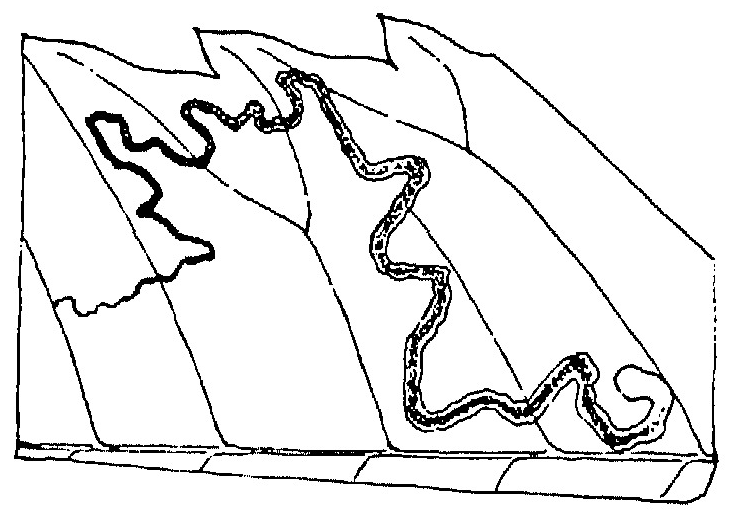
Mine

The wingspan is 3-3.5 mm. Usually there are two generations per year, with larvae maturing in July and overwintering, but occasionally a third generation appears.

The larvae feed on Rhus typhina and Rhus aromatica. They mine the leaves of their host plant. The loosened epidermis is bright green at first, later yellowish, and is marked by a broad blackish frass line nearly as broad as the mine. The larvae are very bright green.
