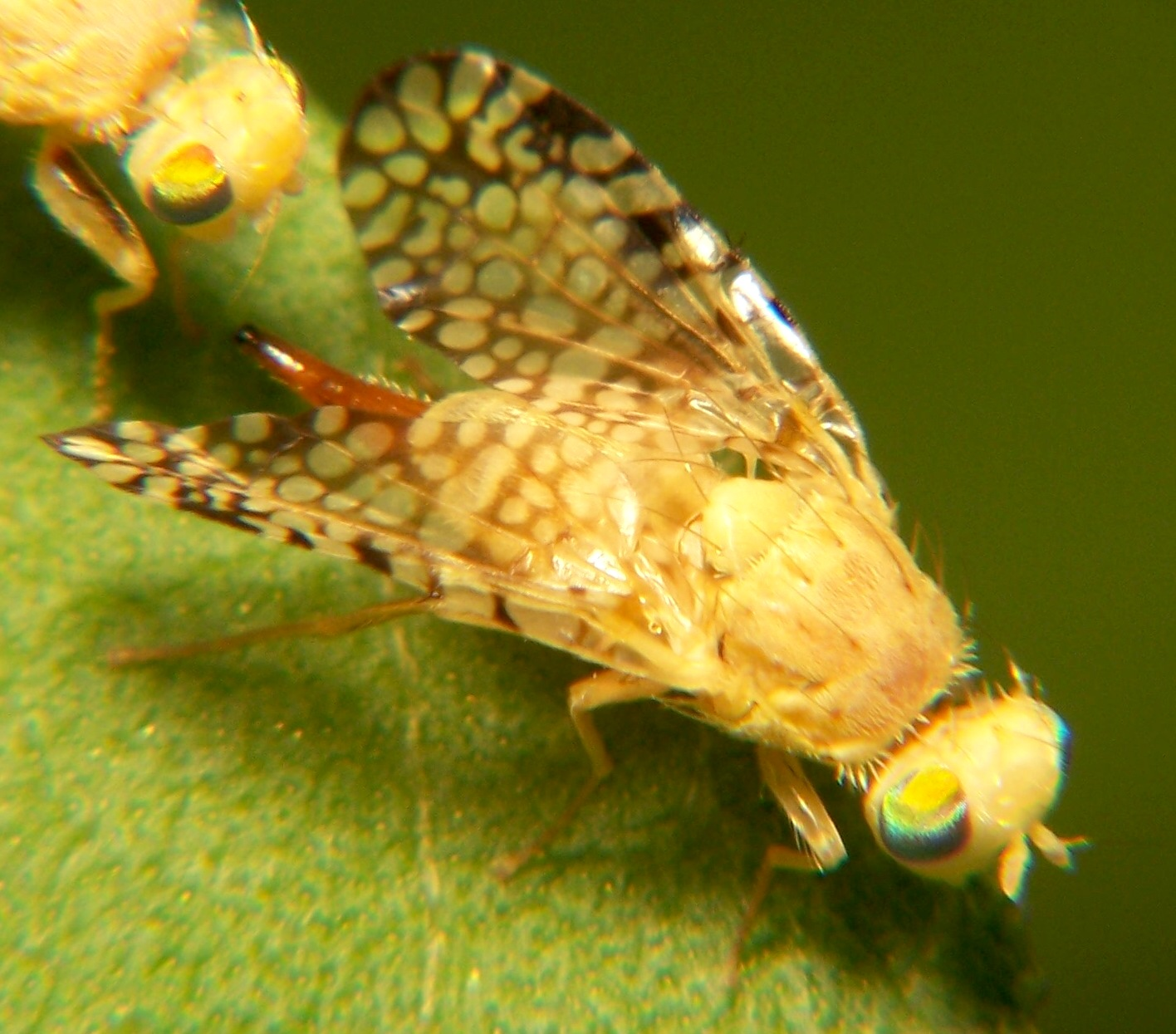
- Euaresta aequalis

Scientific classification
- Kingdom: Animalia
- Phylum: Arthropoda
- Clade: Pancrustacea
- Class: Insecta
- Order: Diptera
- Section: Schizophora
- Subsection: Acalyptratae
- Superfamily: Tephritoidea
- Family: Tephritidae; Newman, 1834

Subfamilies
- Blepharoneurinae; Dacinae; Phytalmiinae; Tachiniscinae; Tephritinae; Trypetinae

Diversity
- 500 genera, about 5,000 species

= Tephritidae =

Family of fruit flies

The Tephritidae are one of two fly families referred to as fruit flies, the other family being the Drosophilidae. The family Tephritidae does not include the biological model organisms of the genus Drosophila (in the family Drosophilidae), which is often called the "common fruit fly". Nearly 5,000 described species of tephritid fruit fly are categorized in almost 500 genera of the Tephritidae. Description, recategorization, and genetic analyses are constantly changing the taxonomy of this family. To distinguish them from the Drosophilidae, the Tephritidae are sometimes called peacock flies, in reference to their elaborate and colorful markings. The name comes from the Greek τεφρος, tephros, meaning "ash grey". They are found in all the biogeographic realms.

== Description ==
For terms see Morphology of Diptera and Tephritidae glossary

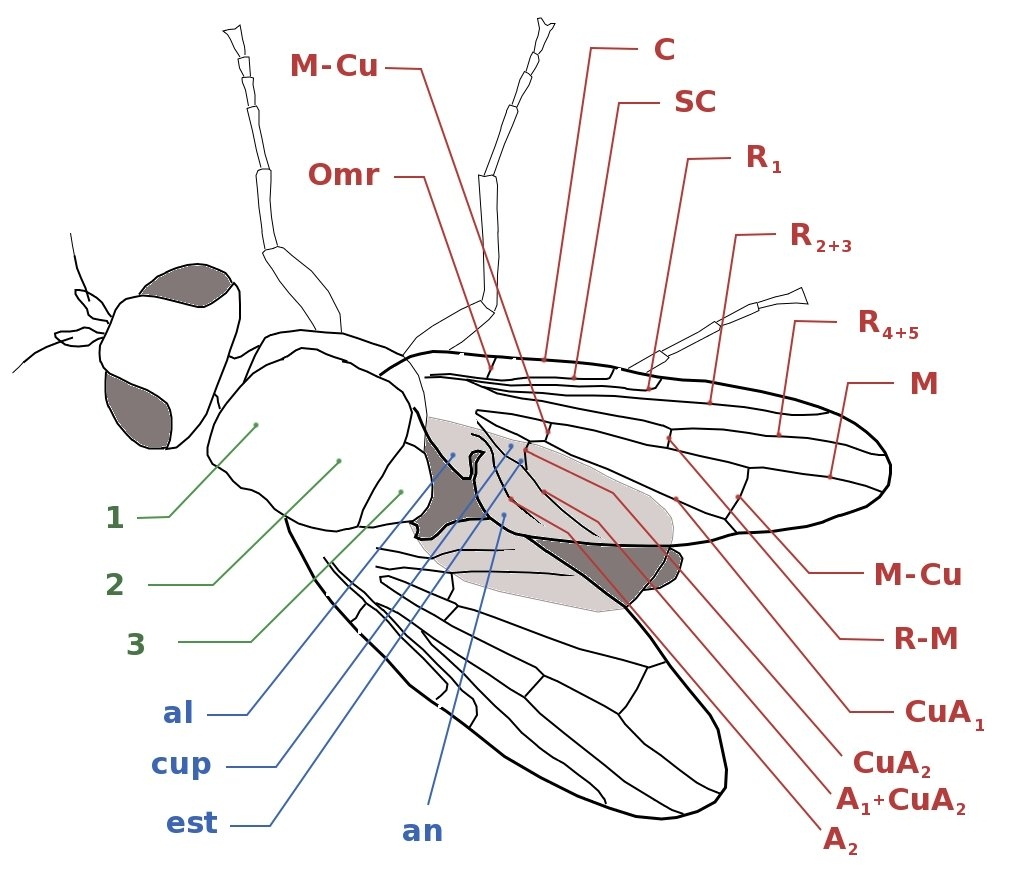
Tephritidae morphology

Tephritids are small to medium-sized (2.5–10 mm) flies that are often colourful, and usually with pictured wings, the subcostal vein curving forward at a right angle. The head is hemispherical and usually short. The face is vertical or retreating and the frons is broad. Ocelli and cellar bristles are present. The postvertical bristles are parallel to divergent. Two to eight pairs of frontal bristles are seen (at least one but usually several lower pairs curving inwards and at least one of the upper pairs curving backwards). In some species, the frontal bristles are inserted on a raised tubercle. Interfrontal setulae are usually absent or represented by one or two tiny setulae near the lunula. True vibrissae are absent, but several genera have strong bristles near the vibrissal angle. The wings usually have yellow, brown, or black markings or are dark-coloured with lighter markings. In a few species, the wings are clear. The costa has both a humeral and a subcostal break. The apical part of the subcostal is usually indistinct or even transparent and at about a right angle with respect to the basal part. Crossvein BM-Cu is present; the cell cup (posterior cubital cell or anal cell) is closed and nearly always narrowing to an acute angle. It is closed by a geniculated vein (CuA2). The CuA2 vein is rarely straight or convex. The tibiae lack a dorsal preapical bristle. The female has an oviscape.

The larva is amphipneustic (having only the anterior and posterior pairs of spiracle). The body varies from white to yellowish or brown. The posterior end of pale-coloured species is sometimes black. The body tapers at the anterior. The two mandibles sometimes have teeth along the ventral margin. The antennomaxillary lobes at each side of the mandibles have several transverse oral ridges or short laminae directed posteriorly. The anterior spiracles (prothoracic spiracles) end bluntly and are not elongated. Each has at least three openings or up to 50 arranged transversely in one to three groups or irregularly. Each posterior spiracle (anal spiracle) lacks a clearly defined peritreme and each has three spiracular openings (in mature larvae). These are usually more or less horizontal, parallel and usually bear branched spiracular hairs in four tufts.

Tephritid fly (Rhagoletis sp.) reflected in a pane of glass

== Ecology ==
Ovipositing Urophora quadrifasciata on Centaurea jacea

Chaetostomella cylindrica mating (notice the parting kiss)

The larvae of almost all Tephritidae are phytophagous. Females deposit eggs in living, healthy plant tissue using their telescopic ovipositors. Here, the larvae find their food upon emerging. The larvae develop in leaves, stems, flowers, seeds, fruits, and roots of the host plant, depending on the species. Some species are gall-forming. One exception to the phytophagous lifestyle is Euphranta toxoneura (Loew) whose larvae develop in galls formed by sawflies. The adults sometimes have a very short lifespan. Some live for less than a week. Some species are monophagous (feeding on only one plant species) others are polyphagous (feeding on several, usually related plant species).

The behavioral ecology of tephritid fruit flies is of great interest to biologists. Some fruit flies have extensive mating rituals or territorial displays. Many are brightly colored and visually showy. Some fruit flies show Batesian mimicry, bearing the colors and markings of dangerous arthropods such as wasps or jumping spiders because it helps the fruit flies avoid predation, though the flies lack stingers.

Adult tephritid fruit flies are often found on the host plant and feeding on pollen, nectar, rotting plant debris, or honeydew.

Natural enemies include parasitoid wasps of the genera Diapriidae and Braconidae.

== Economic importance ==
Tephritid fruit flies are of major economic importance in agriculture. Some have negative effects, some positive. Various species of fruit flies cause damage to fruit and other plant crops. The genus Bactrocera is of worldwide notoriety for its destructive impact on agriculture. The olive fruit fly (B. oleae), for example, feeds on only one plant: the wild or commercially cultivated olive, Olea europaea. It has the capacity to ruin 100% of an olive crop by damaging the fruit. Bactrocera dorsalis is another highly invasive pest species that damages tropical fruit, vegetable, and nut crops. Euleia heraclei is a pest of celery and parsnips. The genus Anastrepha includes several important pests, notably A. grandis, A. ludens (Mexican fruit fly), A. obliqua, and A. suspensa. Other pests are Strauzia longipennis, a pest of sunflowers and Rhagoletis mendax, a pest of blueberries. Another notorious agricultural pest is the Mediterranean fruit fly or Medfly, Ceratitis capitata, which is responsible for millions of dollars' worth in expenses by countries for control and eradication efforts, in addition to costs of damage to fruit crops. Similarly, the Queensland fruit fly (Bactrocera tryoni) is responsible for more than $28.5 million in damage to Australian fruit crops a year. This species lays eggs in a wide variety of unripe fruit hosts, causing them to rot prior to ripening.

Some fruit flies are used as agents of biological control, thereby reducing the populations of pest species. Several species of the genus Urophora are used as control agents against rangeland-destroying noxious weeds such as starthistles and knapweeds, but their effectiveness is questionable. Urophora sirunaseva produces larvae that pupate within a woody gall within the flower and disrupt seed production. Chaetorellia acrolophi is an effective biocontrol agent against knapweeds Chaetorellia australis and Chaetorellia succinea, deposit eggs into the starthistle seedheads, where their larvae consume the seeds and flower ovaries.

Since economically important tephritid fruit flies exist worldwide, vast networks of researchers, several international symposia, and intensive activities on various subjects extend from ecology to molecular biology (Tephritid Workers Database).

Pest management techniques applied to tephritid include the use of cover sprays with conventional pesticides, however, due to deleterious impact of these pesticides, new, less impactful and more targeted pest control techniques have been used, such as toxic food baits, male annihilation technique using specific male attractant parapheromones in toxic baits or mass trapping, or even sterile insect technique as part of integrated pest management.

== Systematics ==
Tephritidae is divided into several subfamilies:

- Blepharoneurinae (5 genera, 34 species)
- Dacinae (41 genera, 1066 species)
- Phytalmiinae (95 genera, 331 species)
- Tachiniscinae (8 genera, 18 species)
- Tephritinae (209 genera, 1859 species)
- Trypetinae (118 genera, 1012 species)

The genera Oxyphora, Pseudorellia, and Stylia comprise 32 species, and are not included in any subfamily (incertae sedis).

== Identification ==
- Foote, Richard H.; Blanc, P. L.; Norrbom, Allen L. (1993). Handbook of the Fruit Flies (Diptera: Tephritidae) of America North of Mexico. Cornell University Press (Comstock Publishing).
- Merz, B. (1994). "Diptera Tephritidae". Insecta Helvetica Fauna. 10: 1–198.
- White, I.M. 1988. Tephritid flies. Diptera: Tephritidae.
- White I.M. & Elson-Harris M.M. 1994 Fruit Flies of Economic Significance: their Identification and Bionomics. 2nd ed. International Institute of Entomology, London.
- Drew, R.A.I.; Romig, Meredith C. (2013). "Tephritidae: Dacinae". Tropical Fruit Flies of South-East Asia. CABI. ISBN 9781780640358.
- Hendel, F. (1914). "Die Gattungen der Bohrfliegen". Keys to World Genera (in German). 33: 73–98. Out of date but still the only world monograph.
- Hendel, F. (1927). "Trypetidae". In Lindner, E. (ed.). Die Fliegen der Paläarktischen Region (in German). pp. 5, 49. Keys to Palaearctic species but now needs revision.
- Seguy, Eugene (1934). "Diptères: Brachycères". Muscidae acalypterae, Scatophagidae. Vol. II. Paris: Éditions Faune de France 28. Archived from the original on 2013-10-14 – via faunedefrance.org.
- Rikhter, V. A. (1988). "Family Conopidae". Keys to the insects of the European Part of the USSR. Vol. 5: Diptera (English ed.). Part 2. Keys to Palaearctic species but now needs revision.

== Species lists ==
- West Palaearctic including Russia
- Australasian/Oceanian
- Nearctic
- Japan
- World list

== Gallery ==
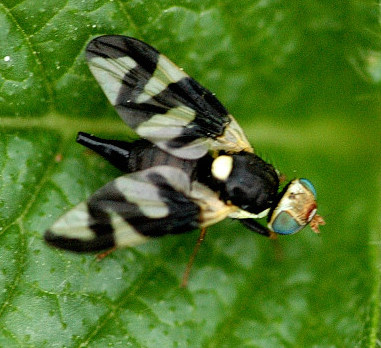
Urophora cardui, male

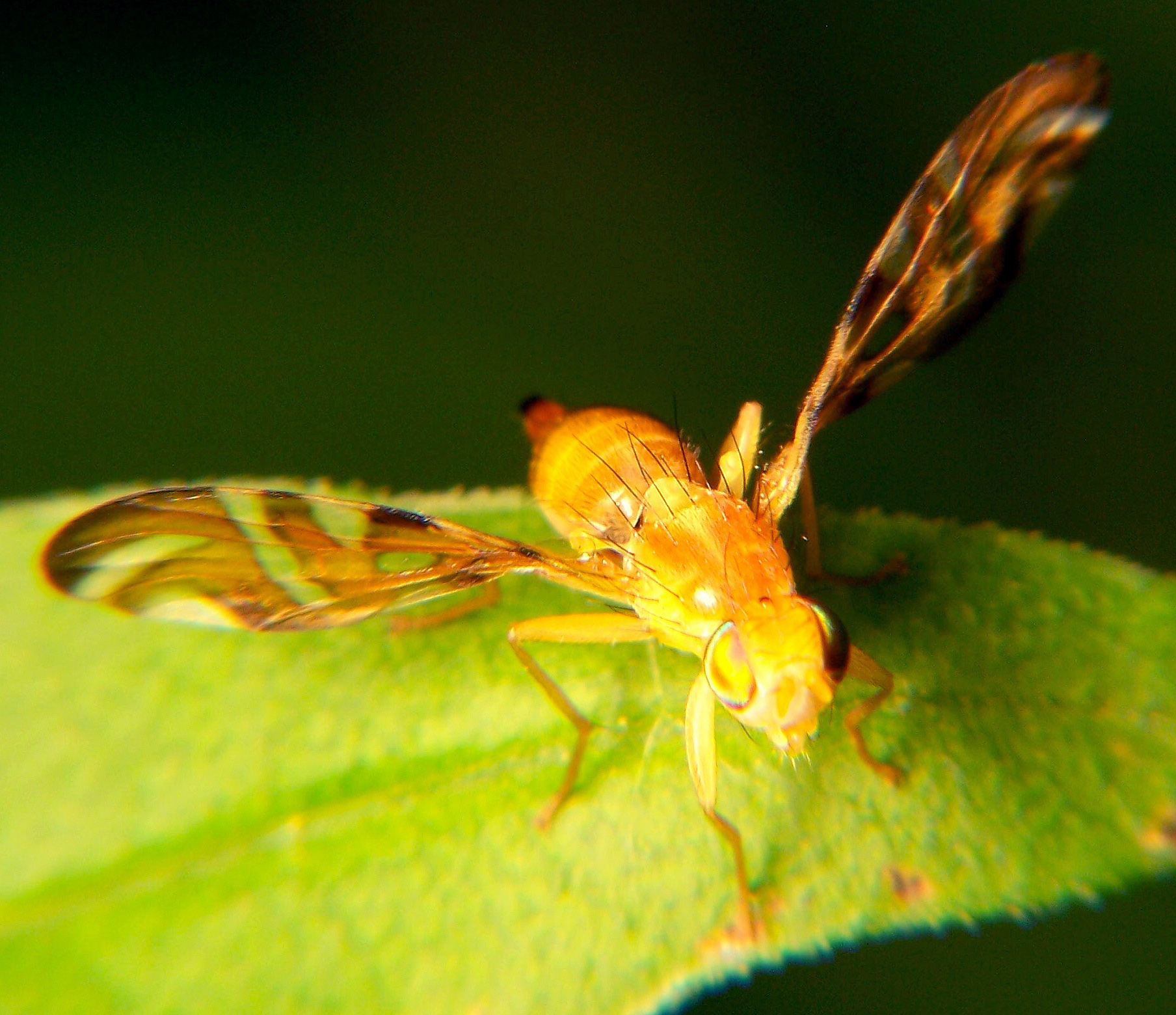
Strauzia longipennis

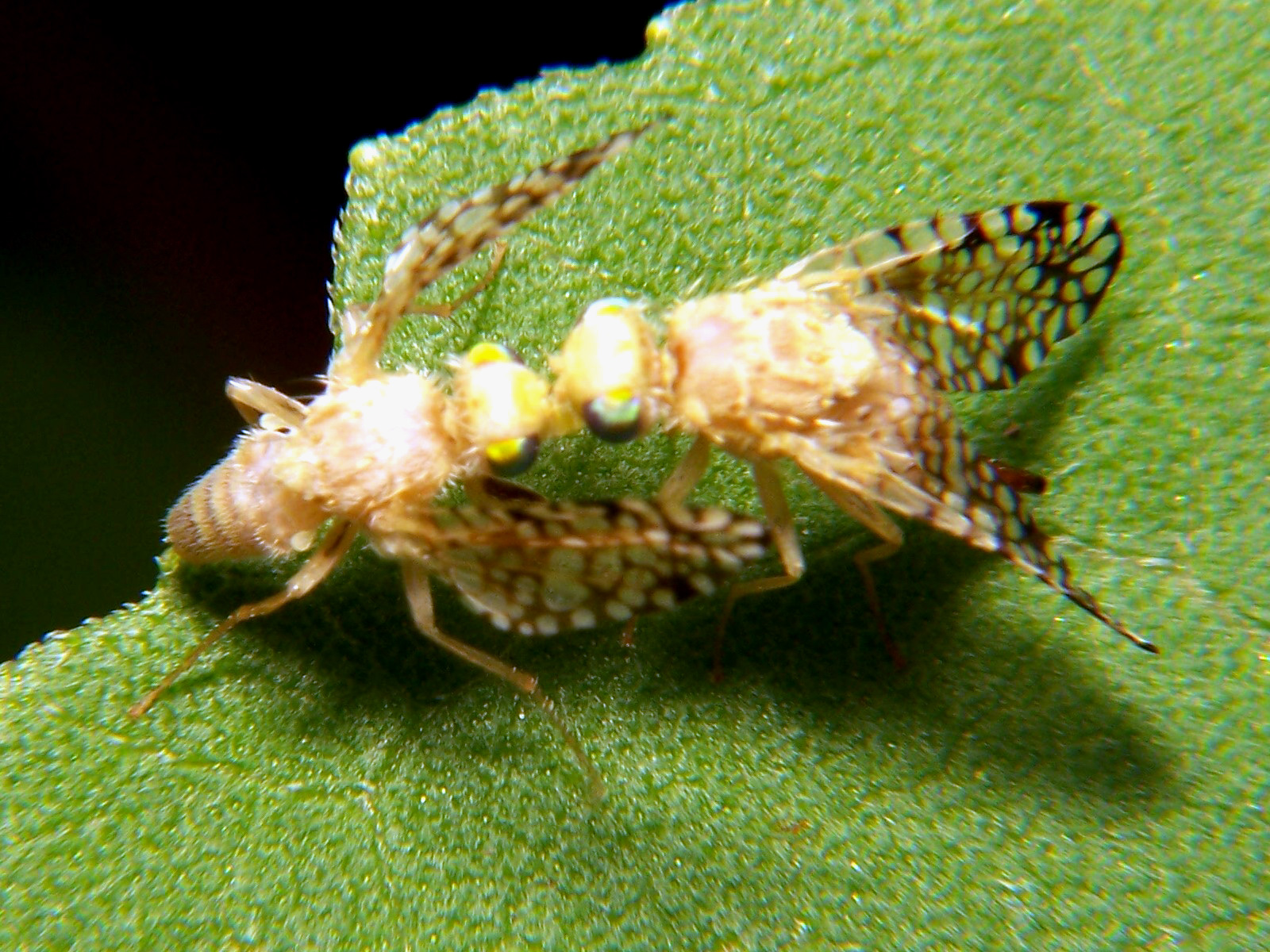
Euaresta aequalis

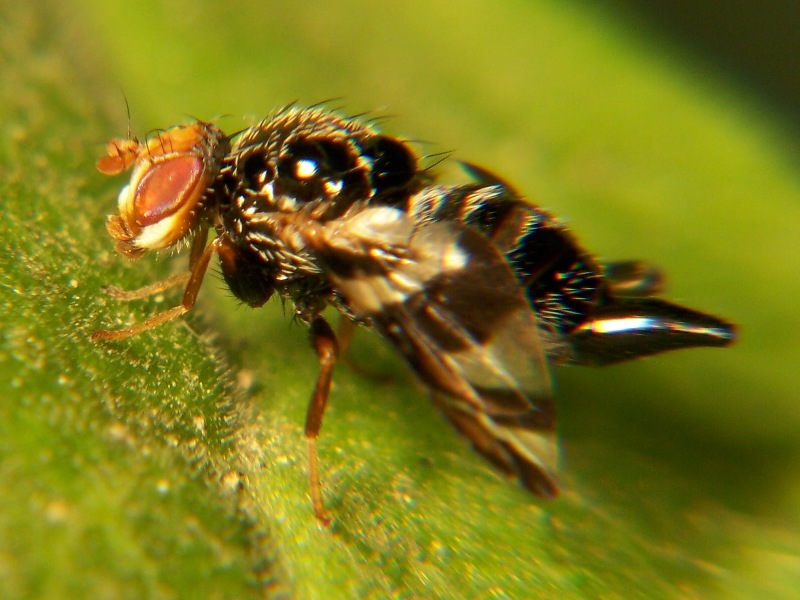
Procecidochares atra

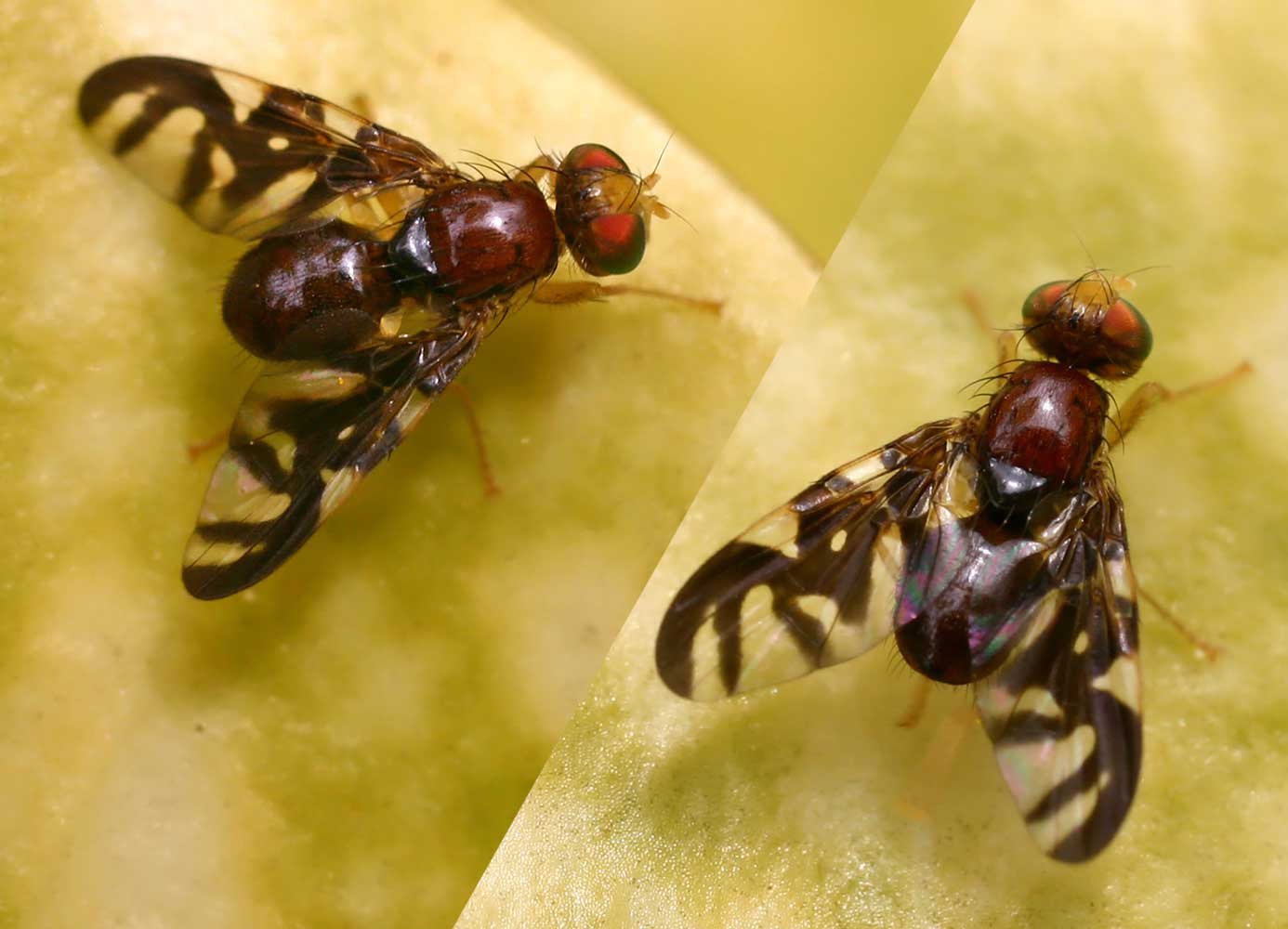
Euleia heraclei

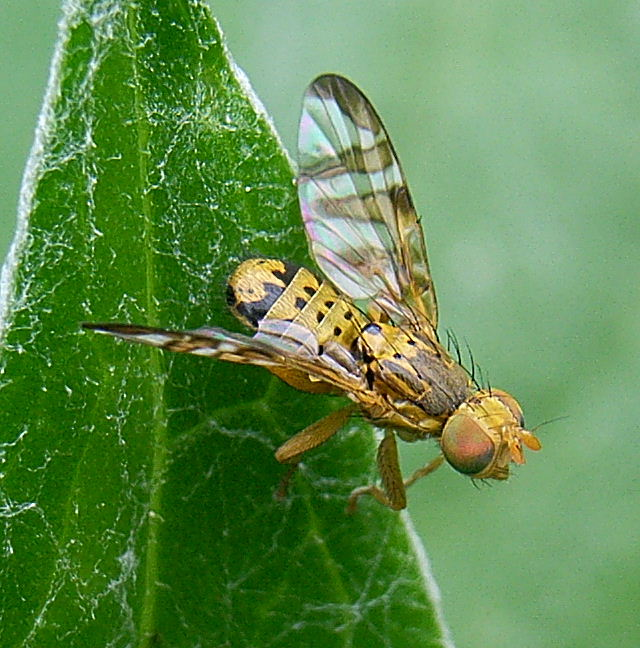
Cheatostomella cylindrica

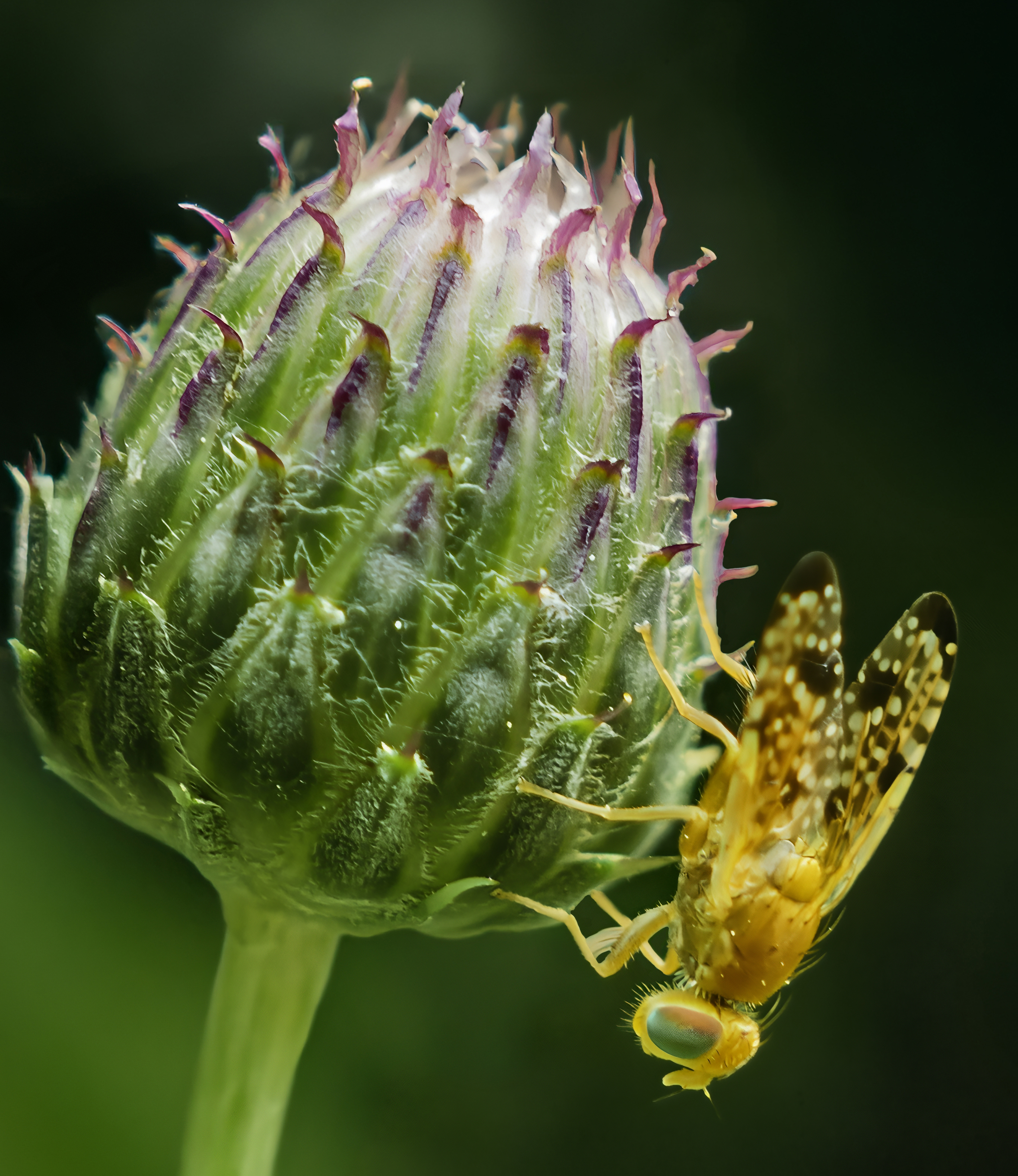
Xyphosia miliaria on Cirsium arvense

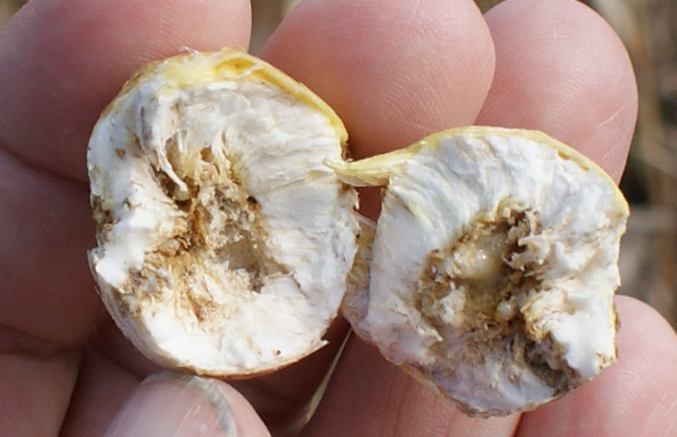
Eurosta solidaginis, gall maker on goldenrod

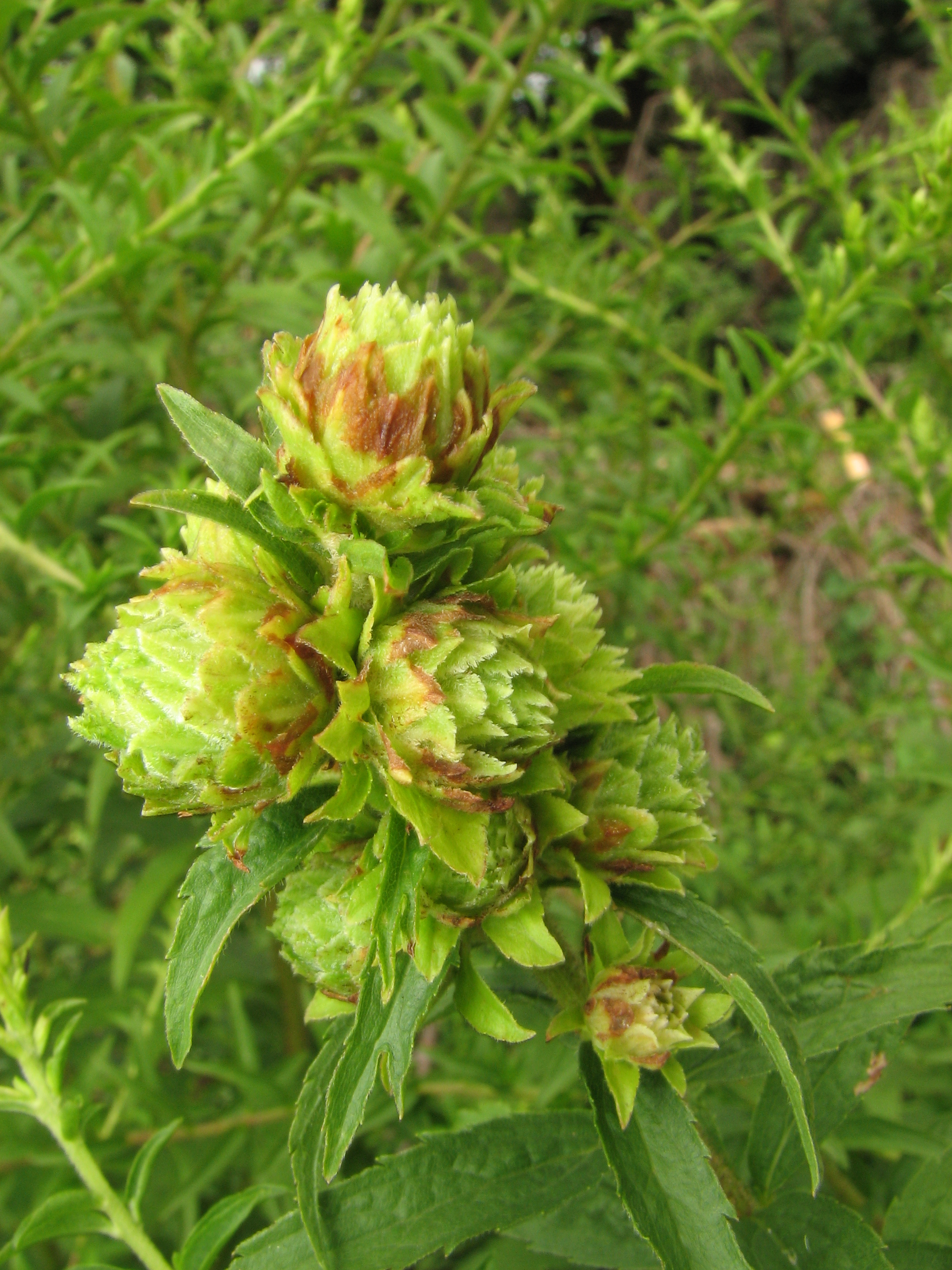
Gall of Procecidochares atra on Solidago

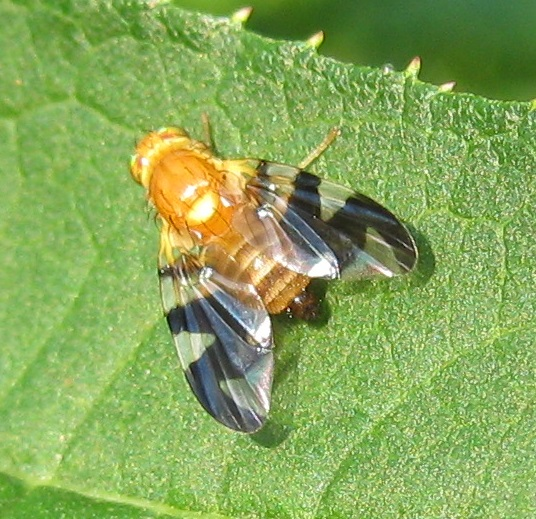
Rhagoletis suavis

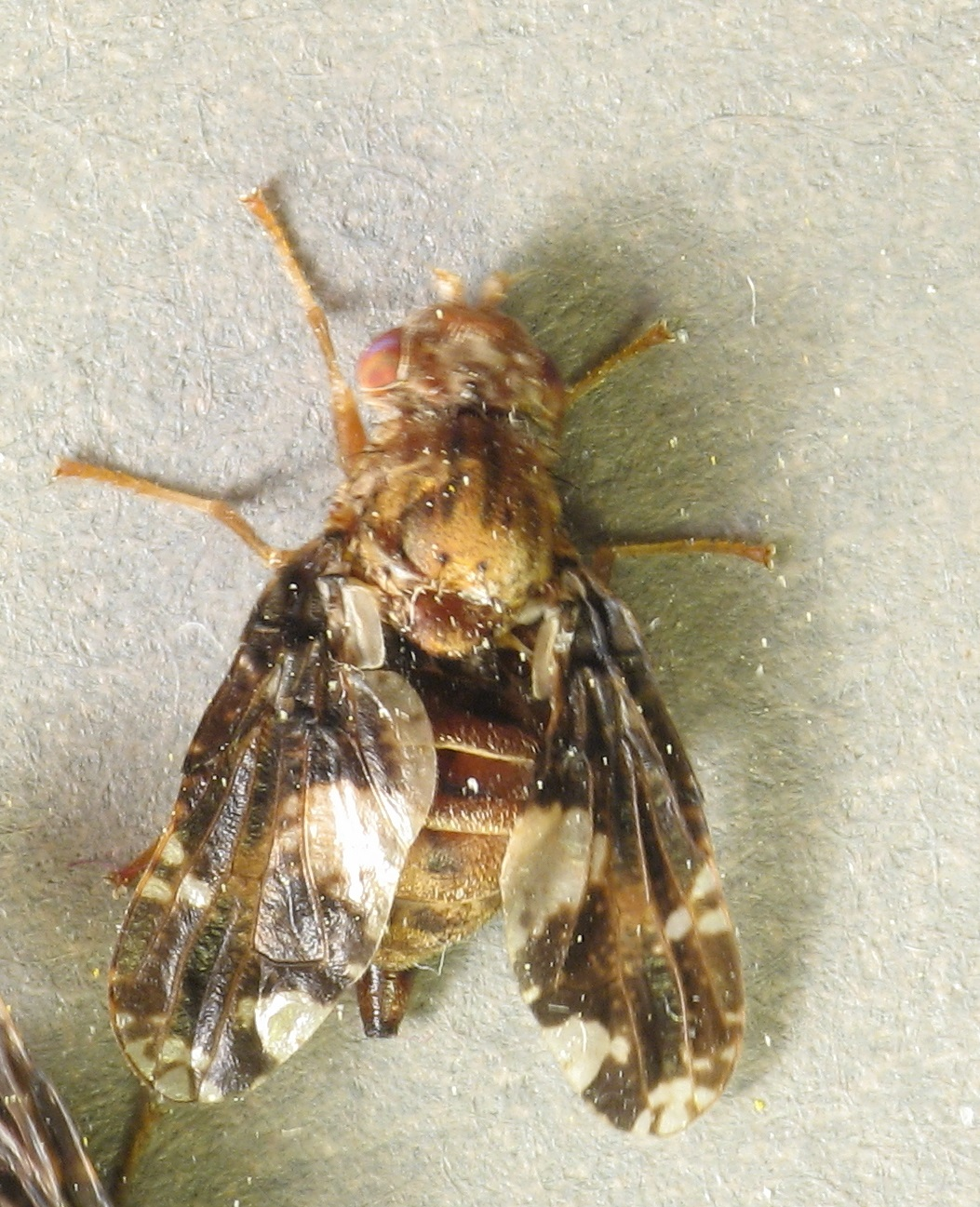
Eurosta solidaginis, female
