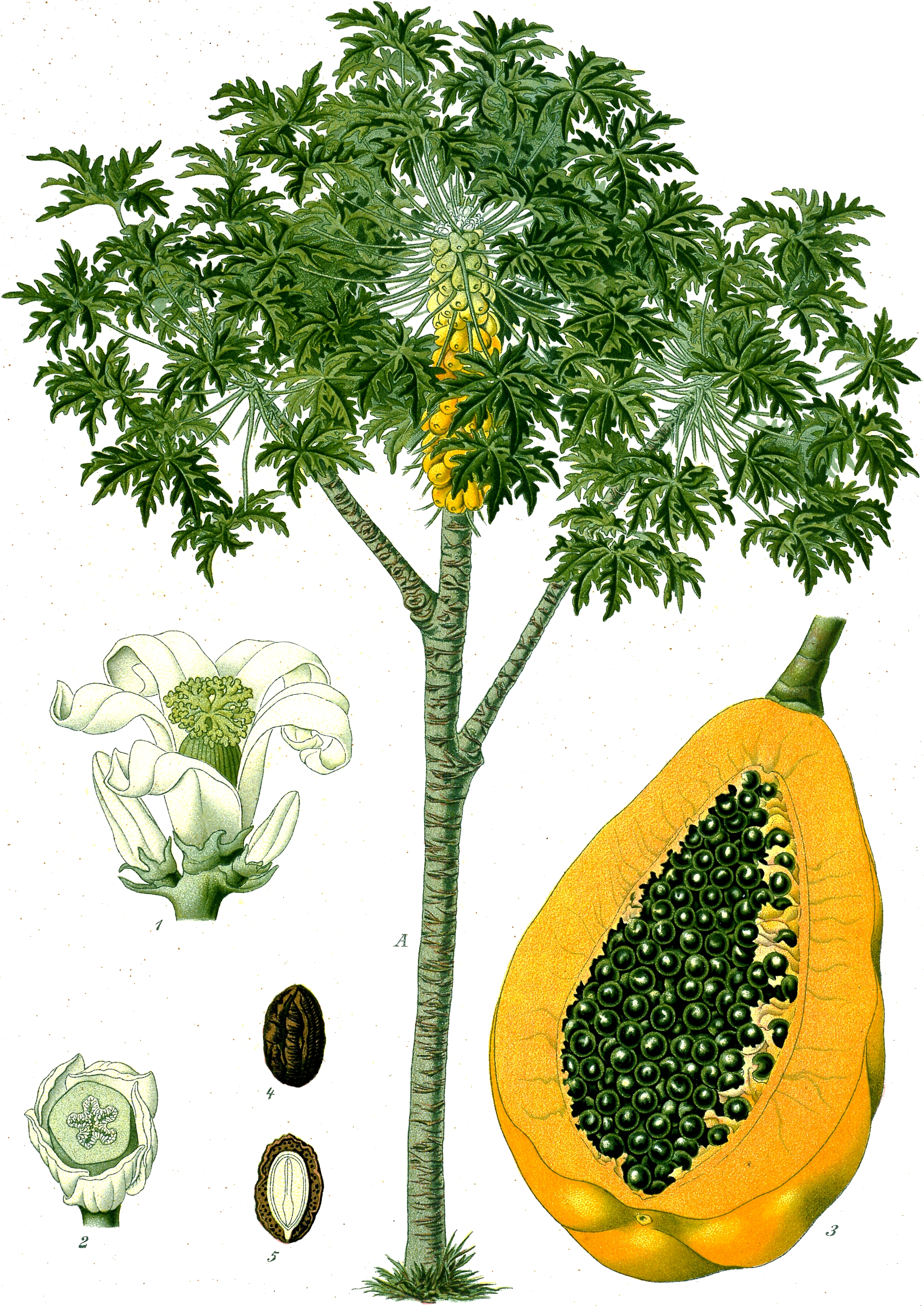
- Plant and fruit, from Koehler's Medicinal-Plants (1887)

Conservation status
- Data Deficient (IUCN 3.1)

Scientific classification
- Kingdom: Plantae
- Clade: Tracheophytes
- Clade: Angiosperms
- Clade: Eudicots
- Clade: Rosids
- Order: Brassicales
- Family: Caricaceae
- Genus: Carica
- Species: C. papaya

Binomial name
- Carica papaya L.

= Papaya =

Species of tropical fruit plant

The papaya (/pəˈpaɪə/, US: /pəˈpɑːjə/) is the plant species Carica papaya, one of the 3 accepted species in the genus Carica of the family Caricaceae.

It was first domesticated in Mesoamerica, within modern-day southern Mexico and Central America. It is grown in several countries in regions with a tropical climate. In 2024, India was the leading producer, accounting for 36% of the world total.

== Etymology and common names ==
The word papaya derives from the Arawakan languages of the West Indies, and is also the name for the plant. It was first used in English around 1600 in reference to the fruit and tree.

In some regions, such as Australia, it may be called papaw or pawpaw. In Australian English, pawpaw and papaya denote the fruit of different cultivars of Carica papaya: the former for "larger fruits with yellow flesh" and the latter for "more elongated fruits with distinctively orange red flesh".

In the United States, papaw and pawpaw are names for a different plant and fruit, Asimina triloba, which is unrelated to the papaya.

== Description ==
The papaya is a large herbaceous plant, usually with a single stem growing from 5 to 10 m (16 to 33 ft) tall, with spirally arranged leaves confined to the top of the trunk. The lower trunk is conspicuously scarred where leaves and fruit were borne. The leaves are large, 50–70 cm (20–28 in) in diameter, deeply palmately lobed, with seven lobes. All plant parts contain latex in articulated laticifers.

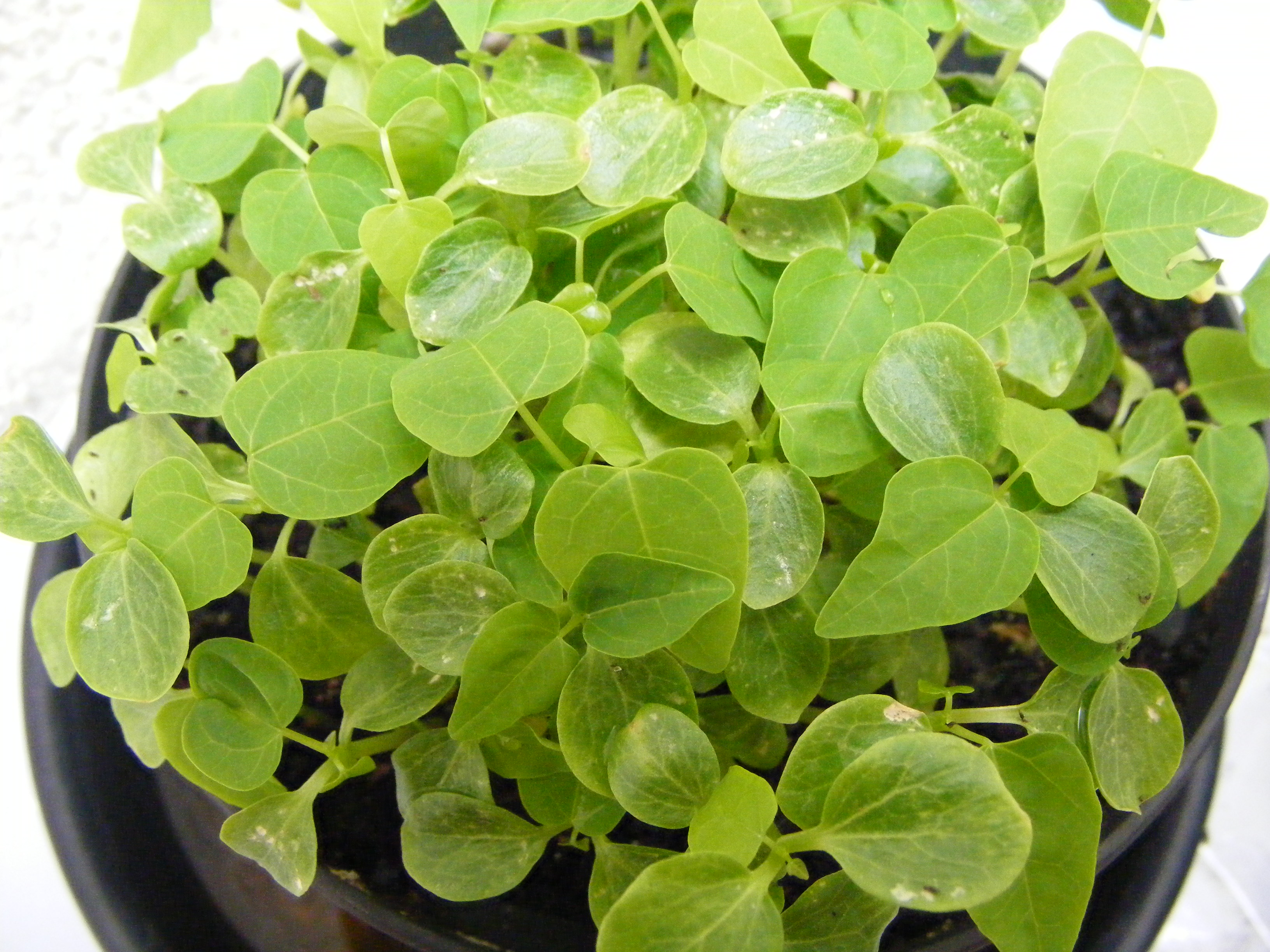
Seedlings

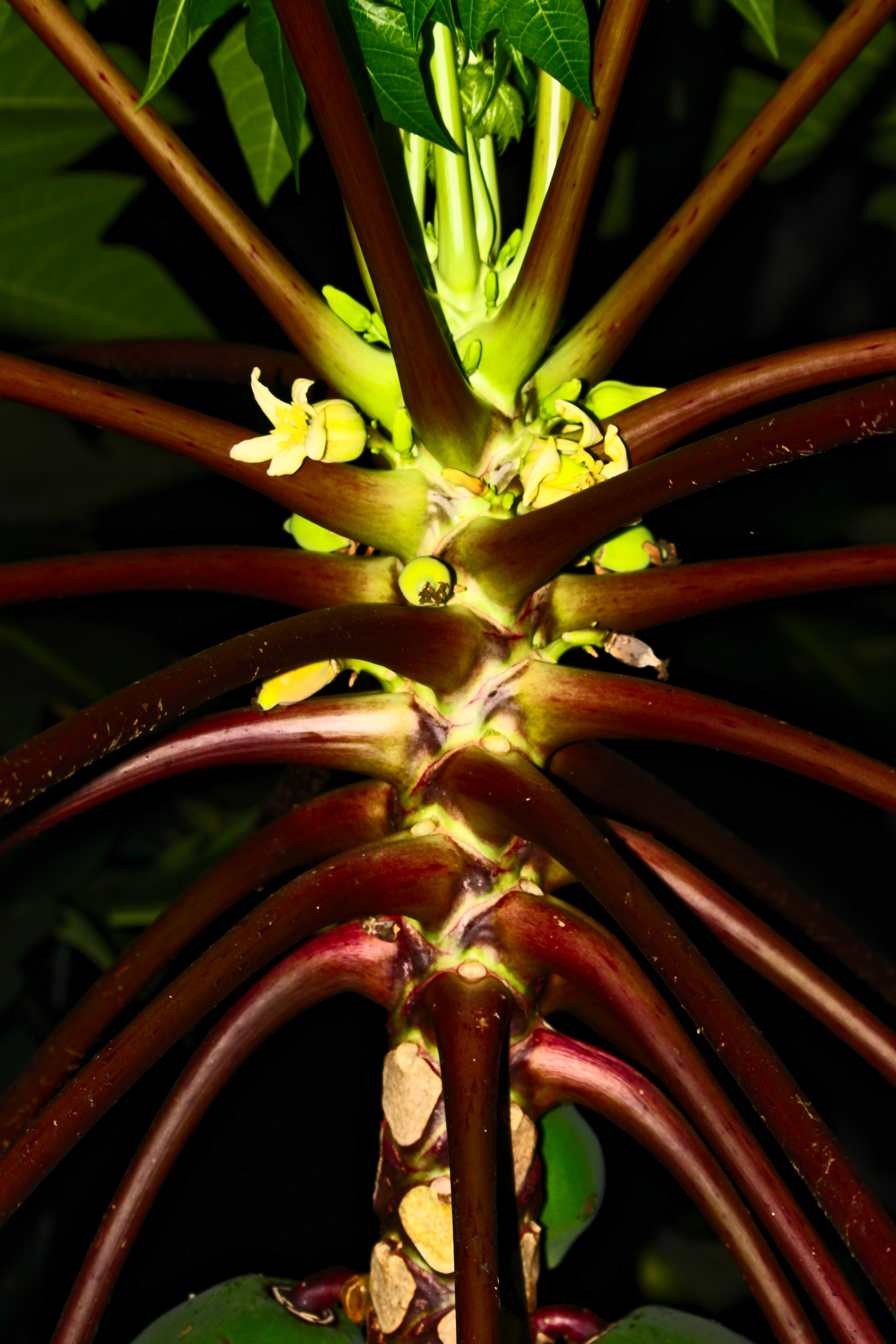
Coiled phyllotaxy of papaya leaves

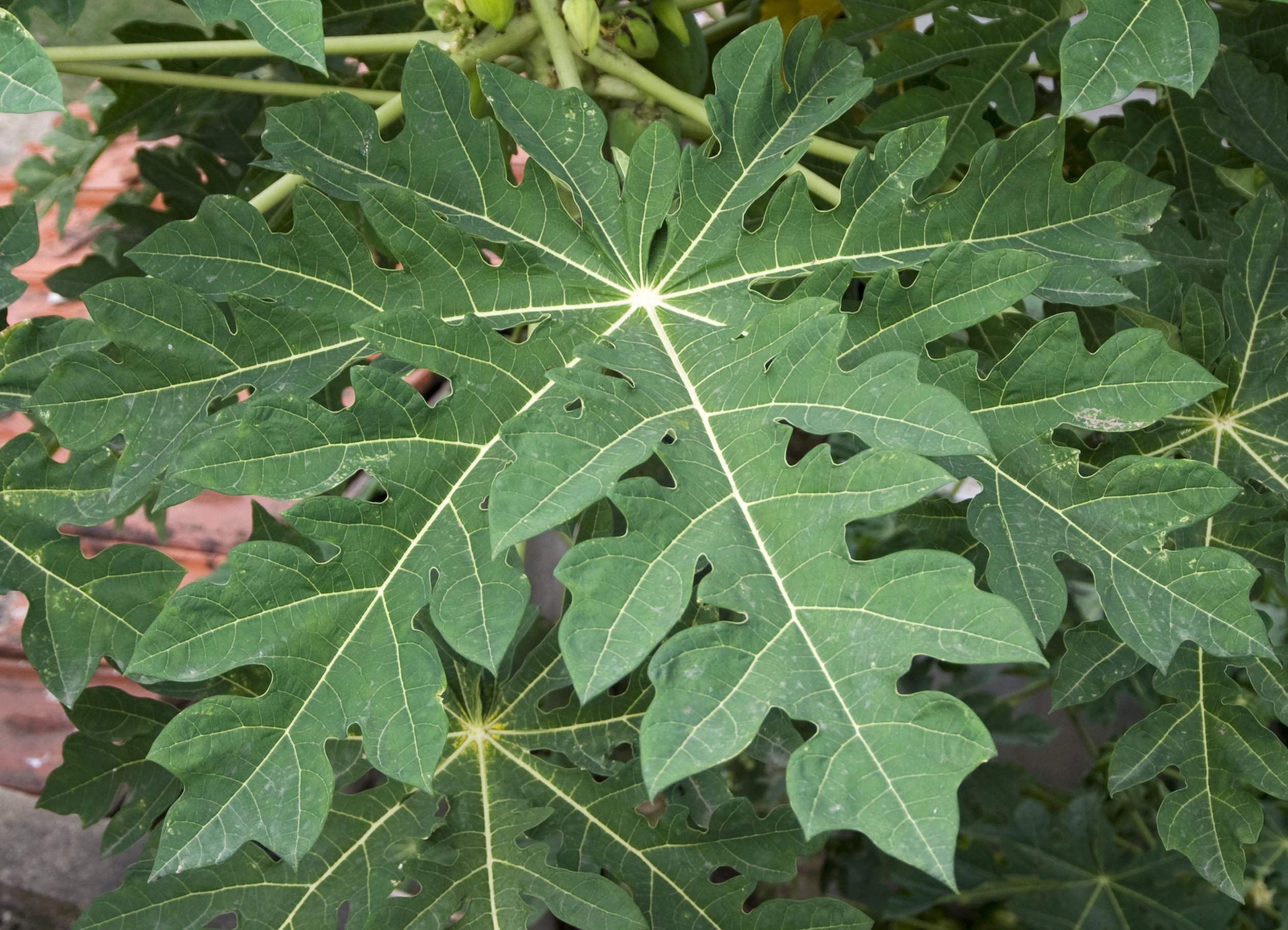
Leaf

=== Flowers ===
Papayas are dioecious. The flowers are five-parted and highly dimorphic; the male flowers have the stamens fused to the petals. There are two different types of papaya flowers. The female flowers have a superior ovary and five contorted petals loosely connected at the base.

Male and female flowers are borne in the leaf axils; the male flowers are in multiflowered dichasia, and the female ones are in few-flowered dichasia. The pollen grains are elongated and approximately 35 microns in length. The flowers are sweet-scented, open at night, and are wind- or insect-pollinated.

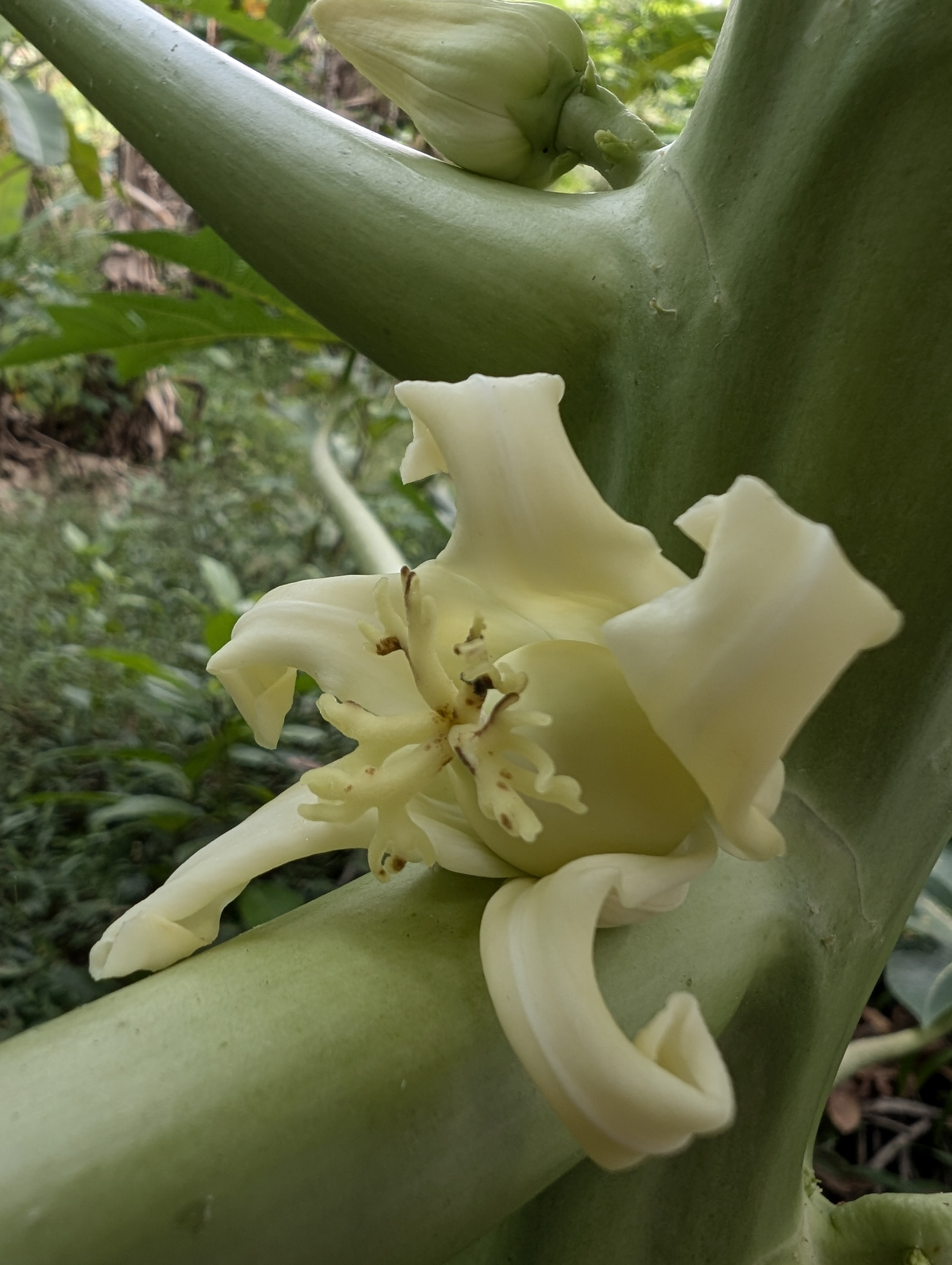
Papaya flower

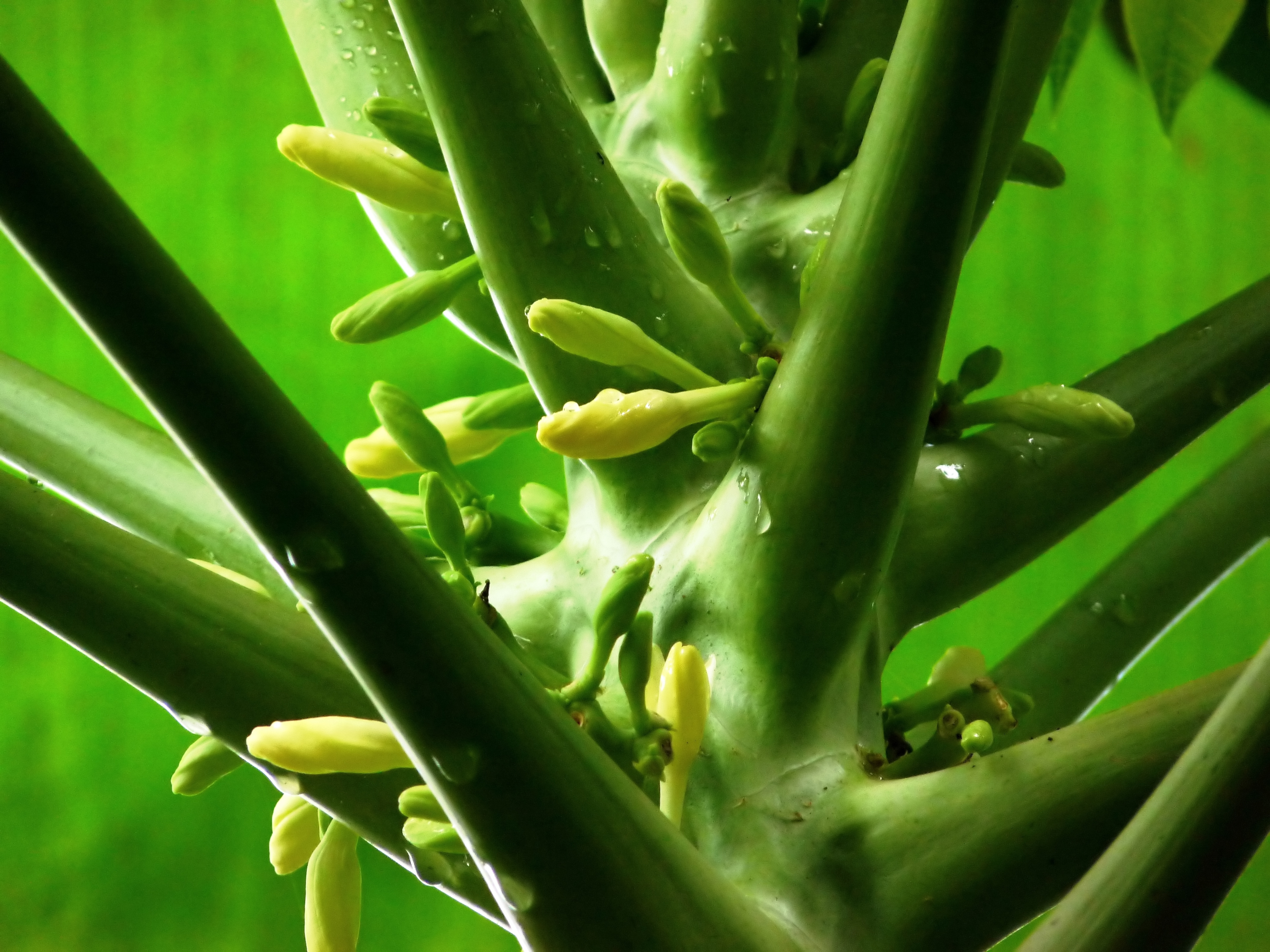
Buds

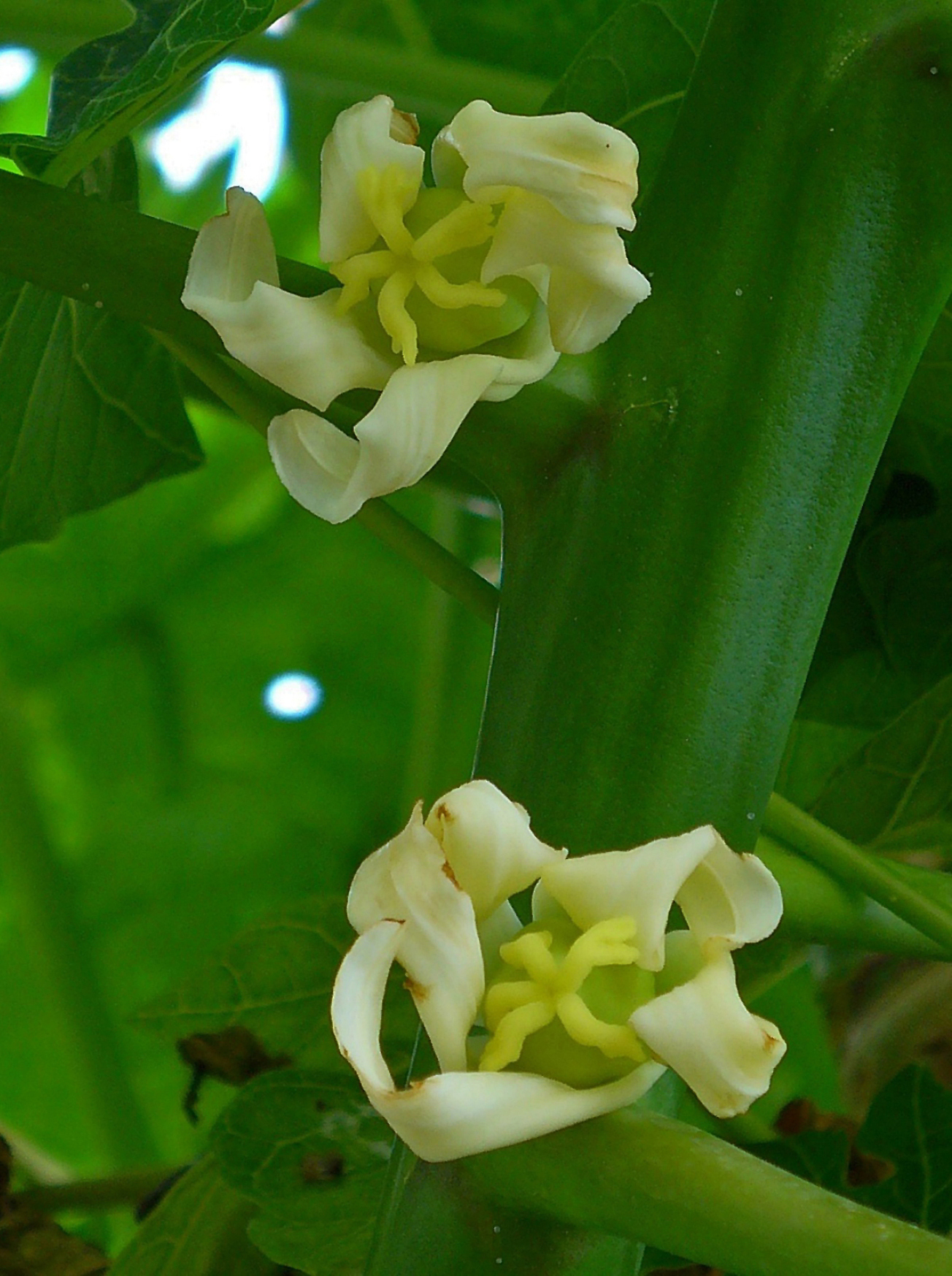
Female flowers

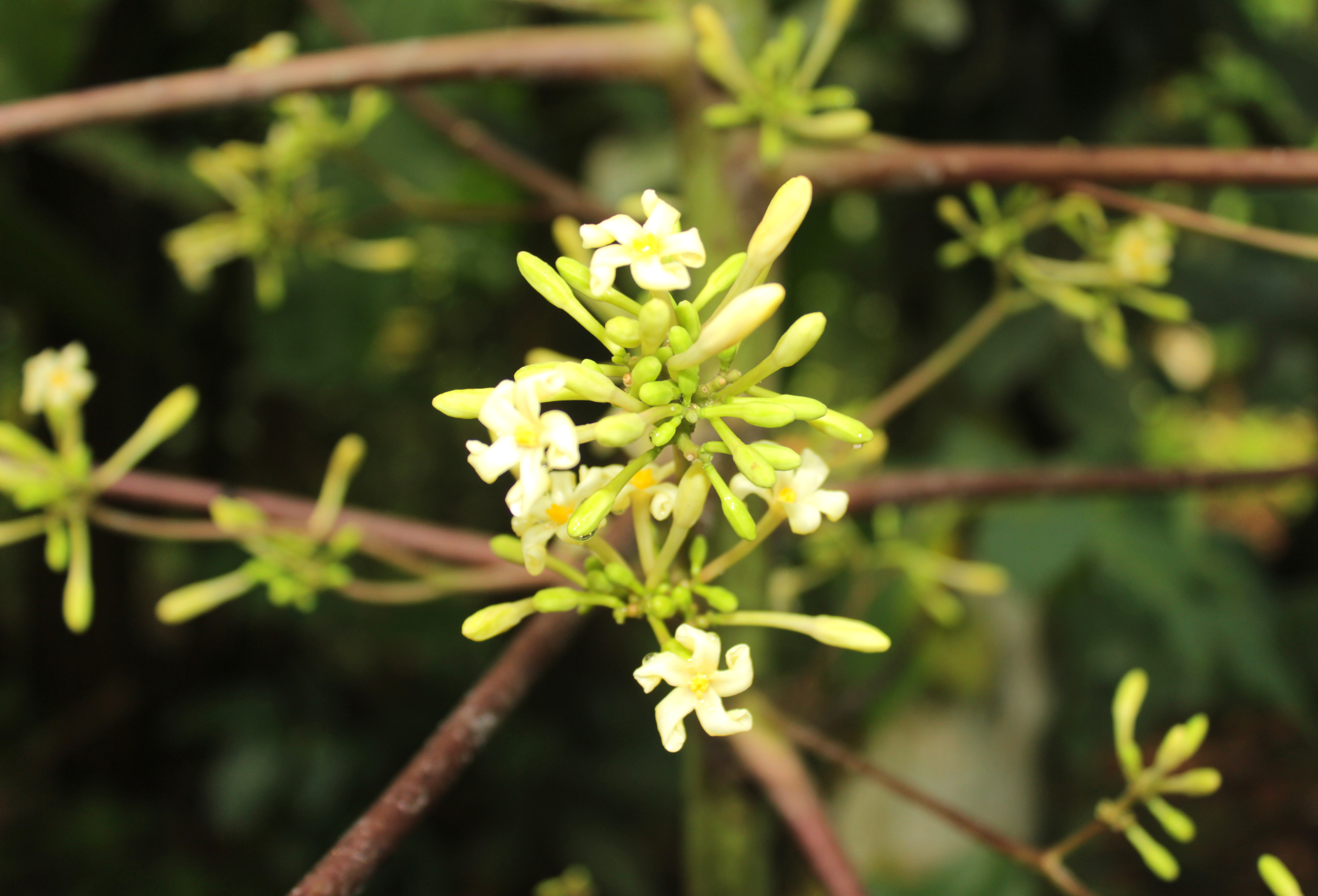
Male flowers

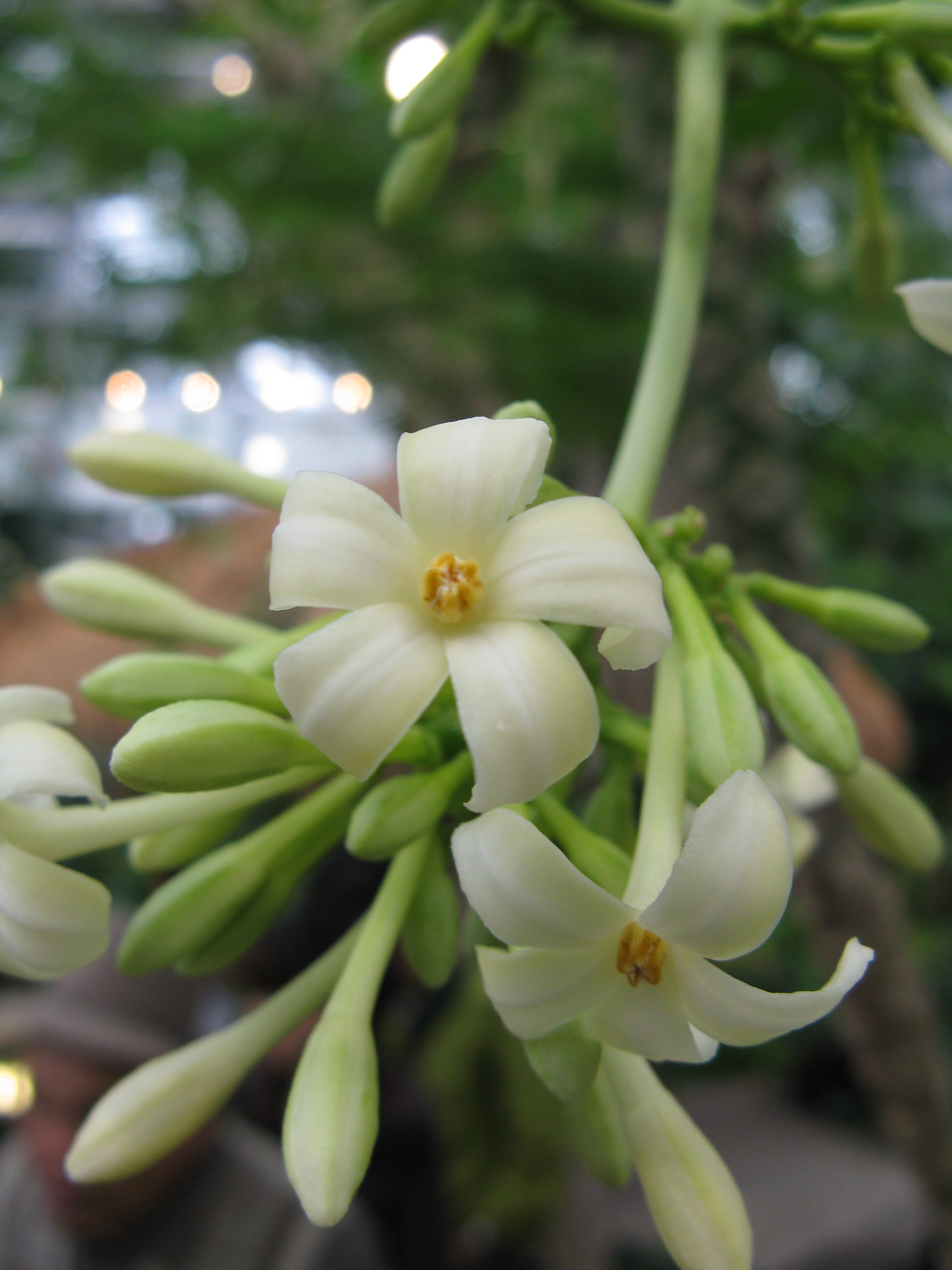
Close-up of male flowers

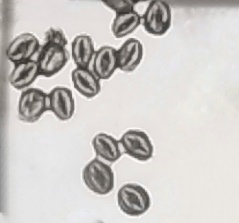
Pollen grains

=== Fruit ===
The fruit is a large berry about 15–45 cm (6–17 3/4 in) long and 10–30 cm (4–11 3/4 in) in diameter. It is ripe when it feels soft (as soft as a ripe avocado or softer) and its skin has attained an amber to orange hue. Along the walls of the large central cavity are attached numerous black seeds.

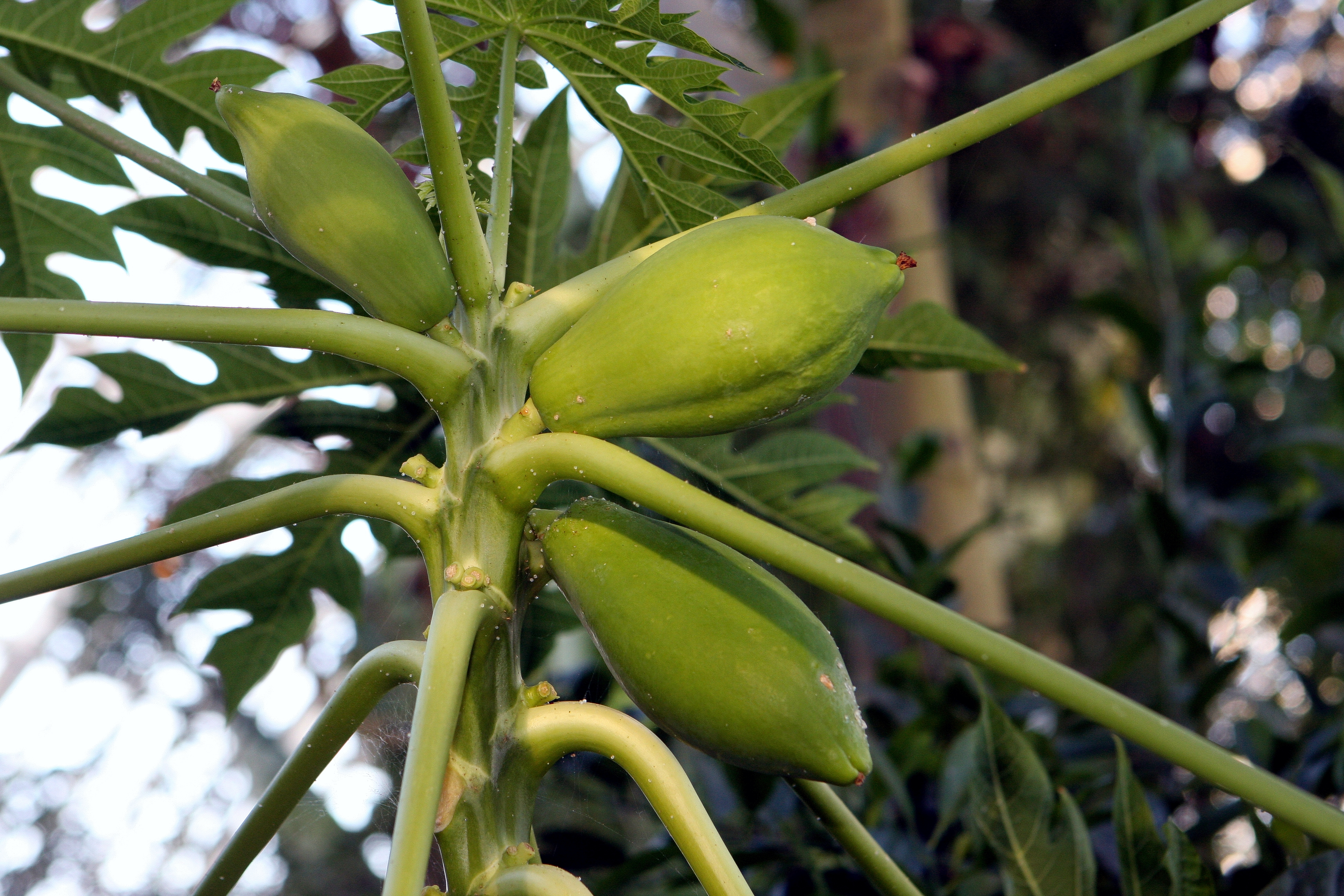
Unripe fruit

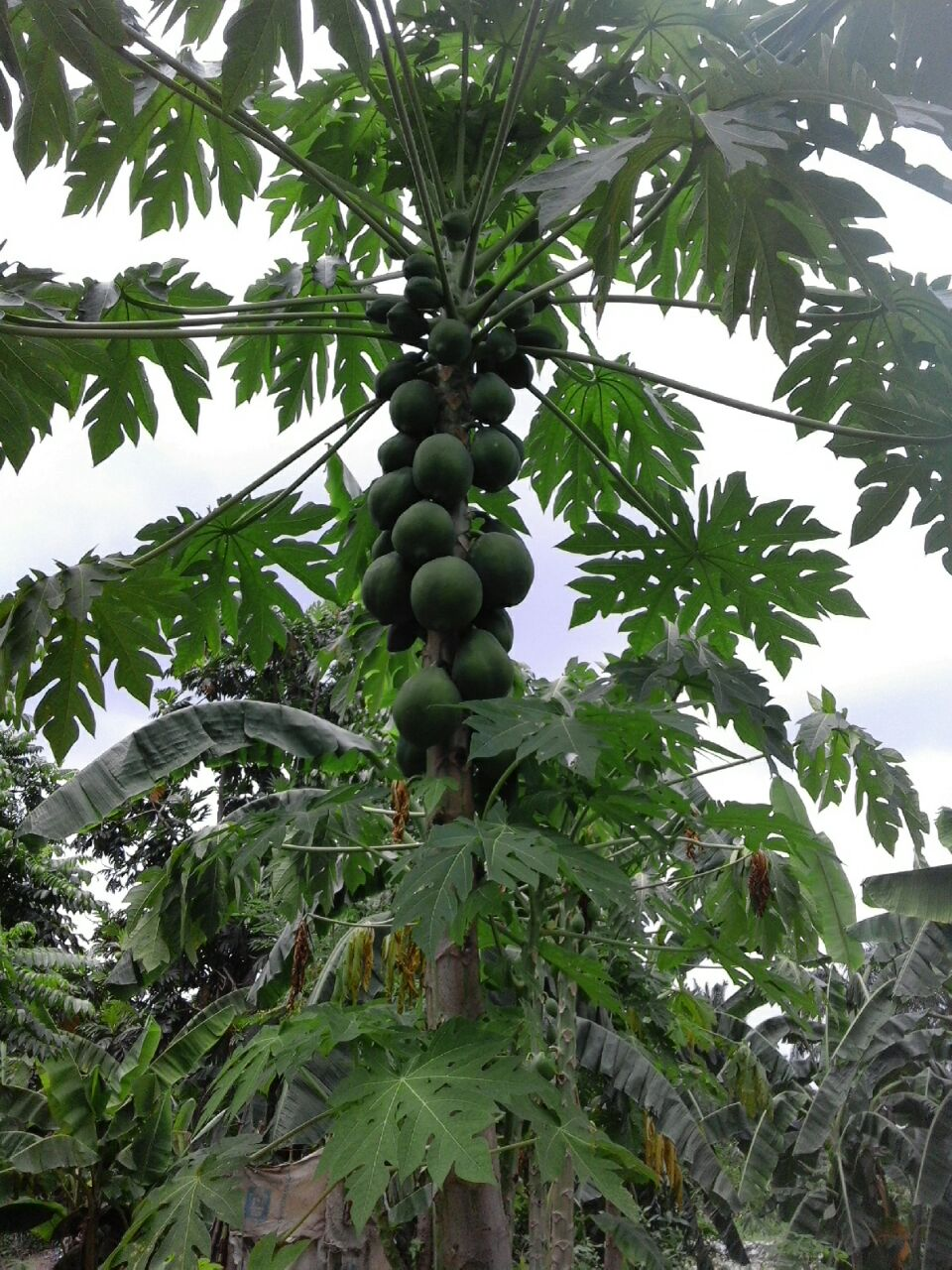
Mature tree with unripe fruit in Kinshasa

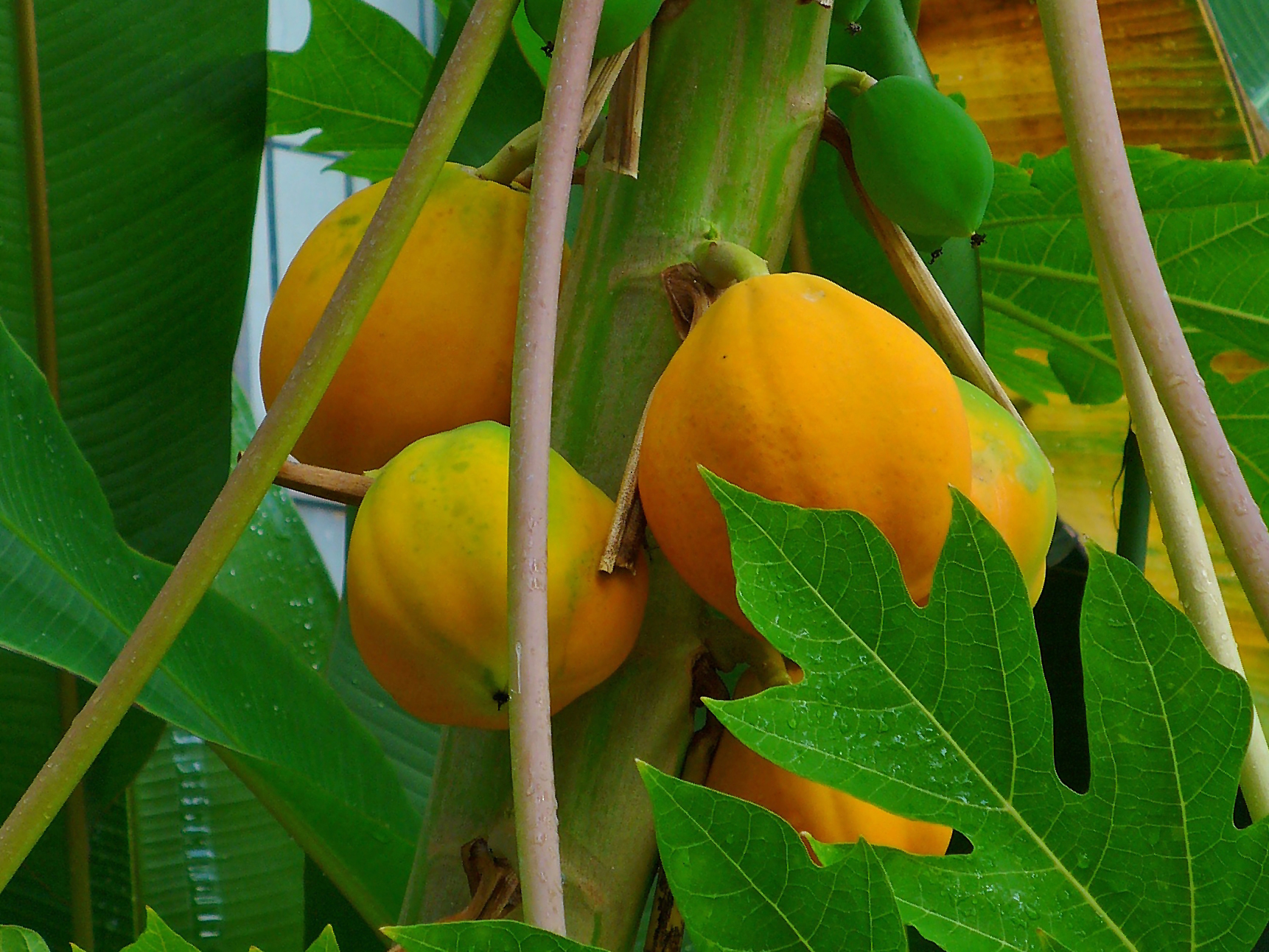
Ripe fruit

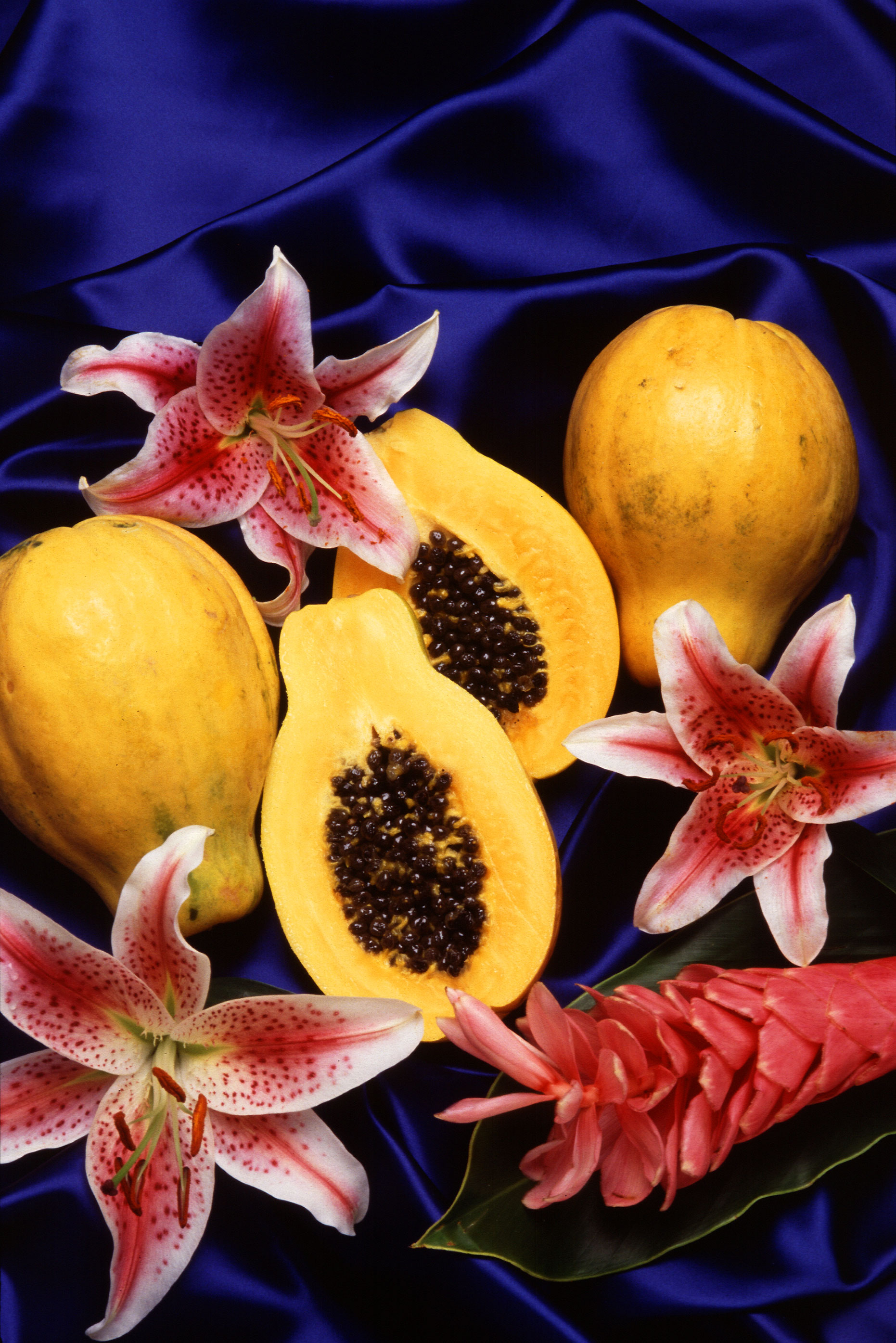
Papayas with yellow flesh

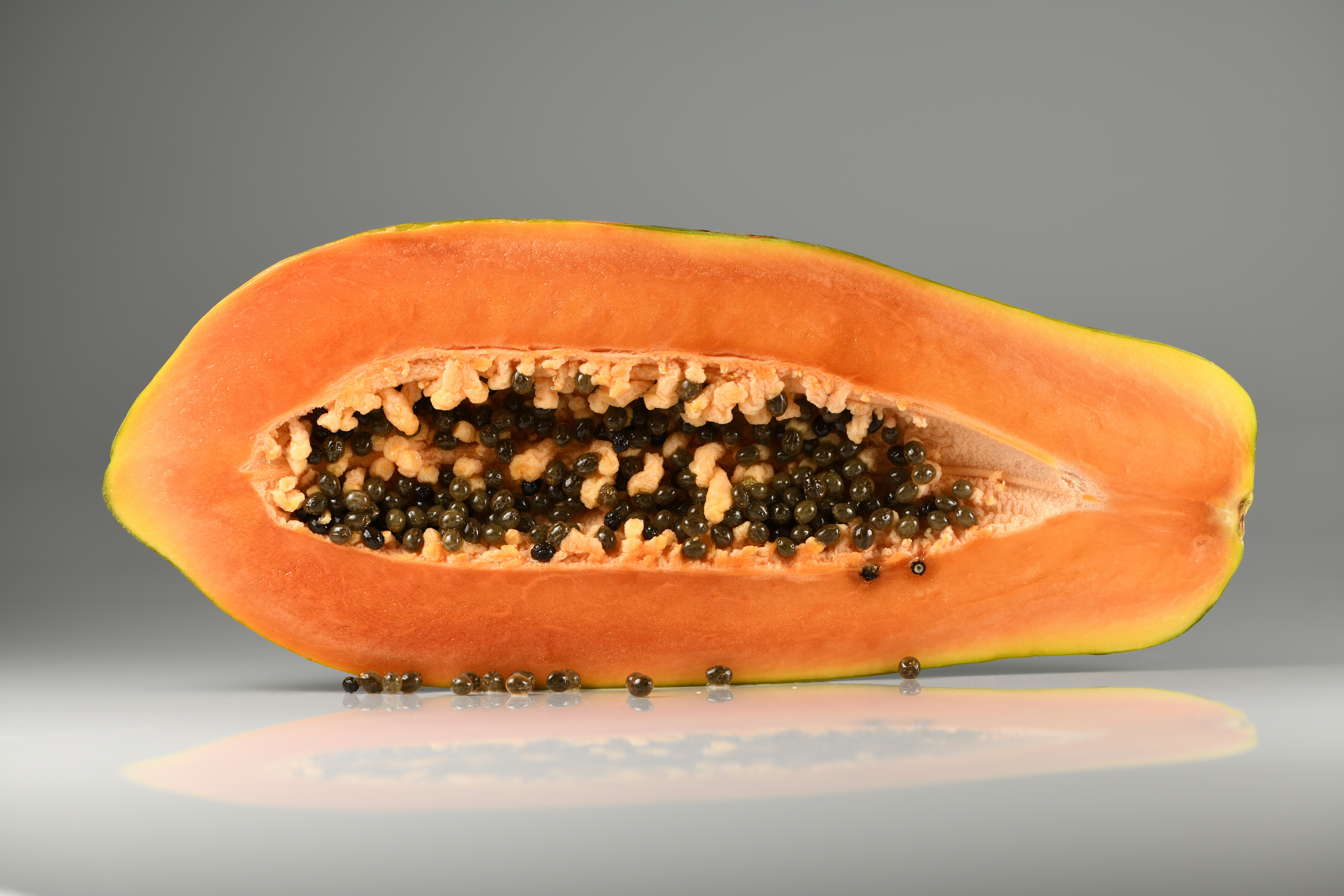
Longitudinal section of fruit showing orange flesh and numerous black seeds

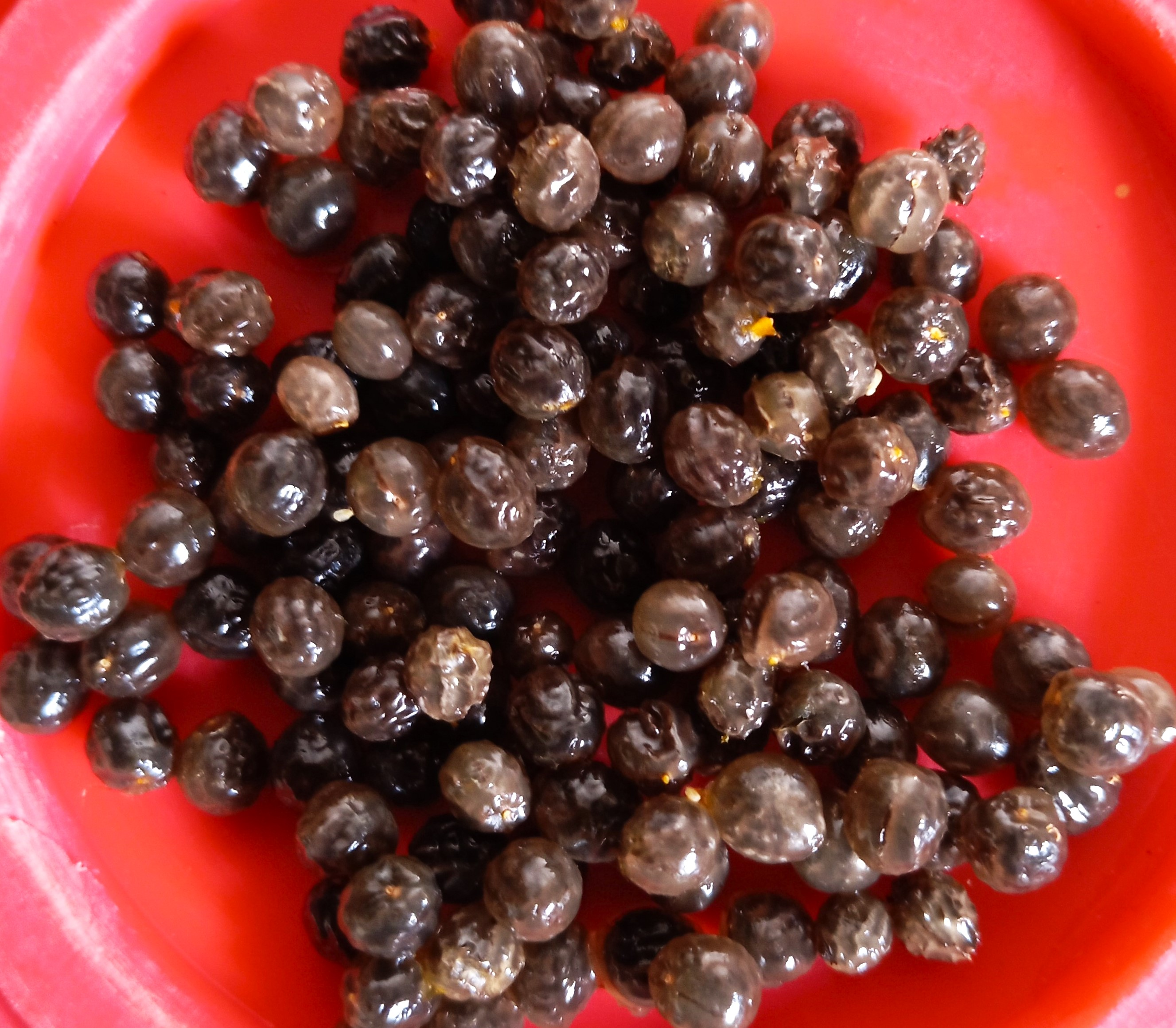
Papaya seeds

Genomic information
- NCBI ID: 3649
- Ploidy: diploid
- Genome size: 372 million bp
- Number of chromosomes: 36
- Year of completion: 2014

=== Phytochemicals ===
Papaya skin, pulp, and seeds contain a variety of phytochemicals, including carotenoids and polyphenols, as well as benzyl isothiocyanates and benzyl glucosinates, with skin and pulp levels that increase during ripening. The carotenoids, lutein and beta-carotene, are prominent in the yellow skin, while lycopene is dominant in the red flesh (table). Papaya seeds also contain the cyanogenic substance prunasin. The green fruit contains papain, a cysteine protease enzyme used to tenderize meat (see below).

== Distribution and habitat ==
Native to tropical regions in the Americas, papaya originates from southern Mexico and Central America. Papaya is also considered native to southern Florida, introduced by predecessors of the Calusa no later than AD 300. Spaniards introduced papaya to the Old World in the 16th century. Papaya cultivation is now nearly pantropical, spanning Hawaii, Central Africa, India, and Australia.

Wild populations of papaya are generally confined to naturally disturbed tropical forests. Papaya is found in abundance on Everglades hammocks following major hurricanes, but is otherwise infrequent. In the rain forests of southern Mexico, papaya thrives and reproduces quickly in canopy gaps while dying off in the mature closed-canopy forests.

== Diseases ==
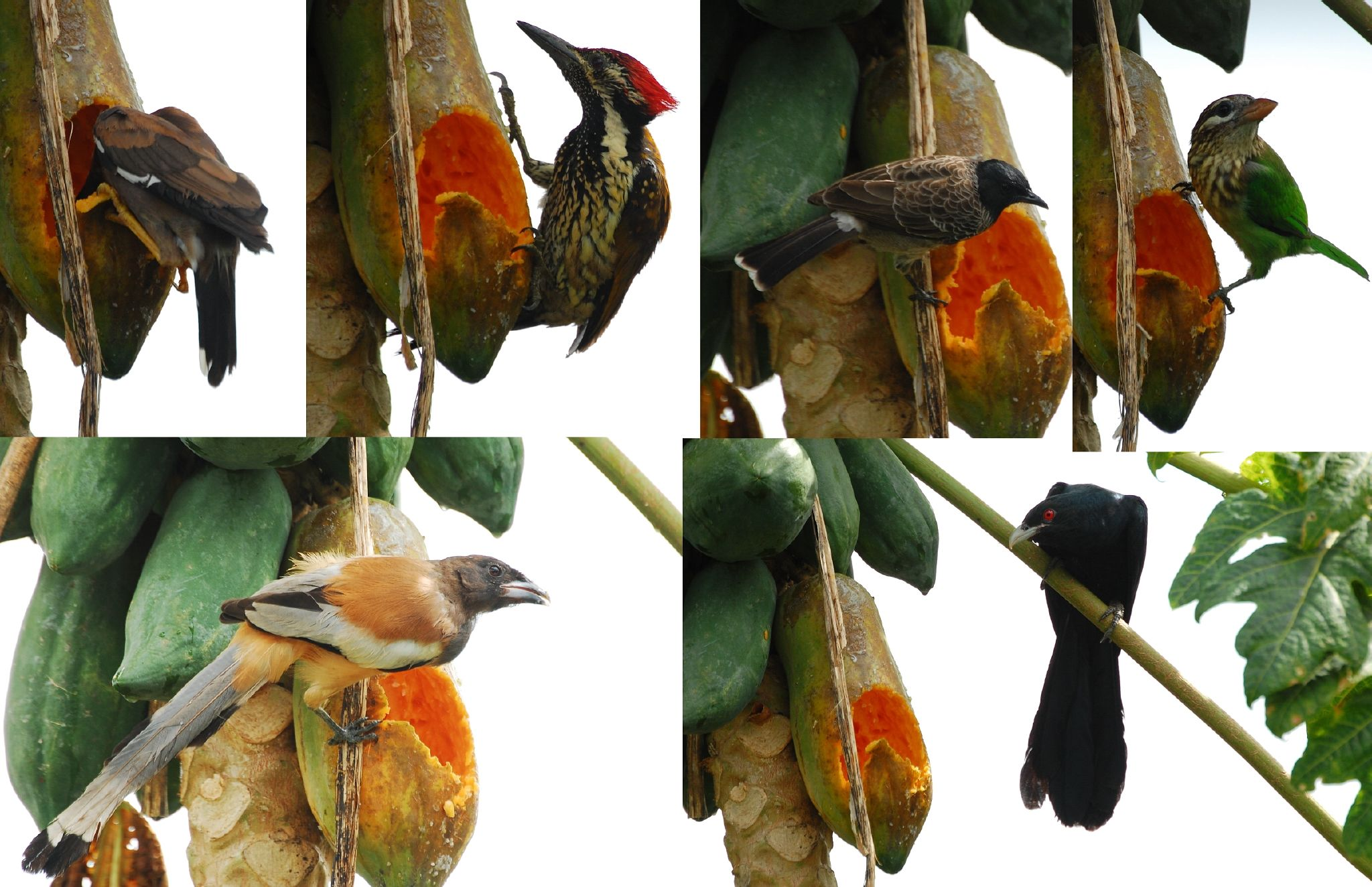
Various birds eating papayas

=== Viruses ===
Papaya ringspot virus is a well-known virus within plants in Florida. The first signs of the virus are yellowing and vein-clearing of younger leaves and mottling yellow leaves. Infected leaves may obtain blisters, roughen, or narrow, with blades sticking upwards from the middle of the leaves. The petioles and stems may develop dark green greasy streaks and, in time, become shorter. The ringspots are circular, C-shaped markings that are a darker green than the fruit. In the later stages of the virus, the markings may become gray and crusty. Viral infections impact growth and reduce the fruit's quality. One of the biggest effects that viral infections have on papaya is taste. As of 2010, the only way to protect papaya from this virus is genetic modification.

The papaya mosaic virus destroys the plant until only a small tuft of leaves is left. The virus affects both the leaves of the plant and the fruit. Leaves show thin, irregular, dark-green lines around the borders and clear areas around the veins. The more severely affected leaves are irregular and linear in shape. The virus can infect the fruit at any stage of its maturity. Fruits as young as two weeks old have been spotted with dark-green ringspots about 1 inch (25 mm) in diameter. Rings on the fruit are most likely seen on either the stem end or the blossom end. In the early stages of the ringspots, the rings tend to be many closed circles, but as the disease develops, the rings increase in diameter consisting of one large ring. The difference between the ringspot and the mosaic viruses is the ripe fruit in the ringspot has a mottling of colors, and the mosaic does not.

=== Fungi and oomycetes ===
The fungus anthracnose attacks papaya, especially mature fruits. The disease starts small with very few signs, such as water-soaked spots on ripening fruits. The spots become sunken, turn brown or black, and may get bigger. In some of the older spots, the fungus may produce pink spores. The fruit ends up being soft and having an off flavor because the fungus grows into the fruit.

The fungus powdery mildew occurs as a superficial white presence on the leaf's surface, which is easily recognized. Tiny, light yellow spots begin on the lower surfaces of the leaf as the disease starts to make its way. The spots enlarge, and white powdery growth appears on the leaves. The infection usually appears at the upper leaf surface as white fungal growth. Powdery mildew is not as severe as other diseases.

The fungus-like oomycete Phytophthora causes damping-off, root rot, stem rot, stem girdling, and fruit rot. Damping-off happens in young plants by wilting and death. The spots on established plants start as white, water-soaked lesions at the fruit and branch scars. These spots enlarge and eventually cause death. The disease's most dangerous feature is the fruit's infection, which may be toxic to consumers. The roots can also be severely and rapidly infected, causing the plant to brown and wilt away, collapsing within days.

=== Pests ===
The papaya fruit fly lays its eggs inside of the fruit, possibly up to 100 or more eggs. The eggs usually hatch within 12 days when they begin to feed on seeds and interior parts of the fruit. When the larvae mature, usually 16 days after being hatched, they eat their way out of the fruit, drop to the ground, and pupate in the soil to emerge within one to two weeks later as mature flies. The infected papaya turns yellow and drops to the ground after the papaya fruit fly infestation.

The two-spotted spider mite is a 0.5-mm-long brown or orange-red or a green, greenish-yellow translucent oval pest. They all have needle-like piercing-sucking mouthparts and feed by piercing the plant tissue with their mouthparts, usually on the underside of the plant. The spider mites spin fine threads of webbing on the host plant, and when they remove the sap, the mesophyll tissue collapses, and a small chlorotic spot forms at the feeding sites. The leaves of the papaya fruit turn yellow, gray, or bronze. If the spider mites are not controlled, they can cause the death of the fruit.

The papaya whitefly lays yellow, oval eggs that appear dusted on the undersides of the leaves. They eat papaya leaves, therefore damaging the fruit. There, the eggs developed into flies in three stages called instars. The first instar has well-developed legs and is the only mobile immature life stage. The crawlers insert their mouthparts in the lower surfaces of the leaf when they find it suitable and usually do not move again in this stage. The next instars are flattened, oval, and scale-like. In the final stage, the pupal whiteflies are more convex, with large, conspicuously red eyes.

Papayas are one of the most common hosts for fruit flies like A. suspensa, which lay their eggs in overripe or spoiled papayas. The larvae of these flies then consume the fruit to gain nutrients until they can proceed into the pupal stage. This parasitism has led to extensive economic costs for nations in Central America.

== Cultivation ==
Historical accounts from 18th-century travelers and botanists suggested that papaya seeds were transported from the Caribbean to Malacca and then to India. From Malacca or the Philippines, papaya spread throughout Asia and into the South Pacific region. Credit for introducing papaya to Hawaii is often given to Francisco de Paula Marín, a Spanish explorer and horticulturist, who brought it from the Marquesas Islands in the early 1800s. Since then, papaya cultivation has expanded to all tropical countries and many subtropical regions worldwide. Today, papaya is grown extensively across the globe, owing to its adaptability to various climates and its popularity as a tropical fruit.

Papaya plants grow in three sexes: male, female, and hermaphrodite. The male produces only pollen, never fruit. The female produces small, inedible fruits unless pollinated. The hermaphrodite can self-pollinate since its flowers contain both male stamens and female ovaries. Almost all commercial papaya orchards contain only hermaphrodites.

Originally from southern Mexico (particularly Chiapas and Veracruz), Central America, northern South America, and southern Florida the papaya is now cultivated in most tropical countries. In cultivation, it grows rapidly, fruiting within three years. It is, however, highly frost-sensitive, limiting its production to tropical climates. Temperatures below −2 °C (29 °F) are greatly harmful, if not fatal. In Florida, California, and Texas, growth is generally limited to the southern parts of those states. It prefers sandy, well-drained soil, as standing water can kill the plant within 24 hours.

=== Cultivars ===
Two kinds of papayas are commonly grown. One has sweet, red, or orange flesh, and the other has yellow flesh; in Australia, these are called "red papaya" and "yellow papaw," respectively. Either kind, picked green, is called a "green papaya."

The large-fruited, red-fleshed 'Maradol,' 'Sunrise,' and 'Caribbean Red' papayas often sold in U.S. markets are commonly grown in Mexico and Belize.

In 2011, Philippine researchers reported that by hybridizing papaya with Vasconcellea quercifolia, they had developed papaya resistant to papaya ringspot virus (PRV), part of a long line of attempts to transfer resistance from Vasconcellea species into papaya.

=== Genetically engineered ===
Carica papaya was the first transgenic fruit tree to have its genome sequenced. In response to the papaya ringspot virus outbreak in Hawaii in 1998, genetically altered papaya were approved and brought to market (including 'SunUp' and 'Rainbow' varieties.) Varieties resistant to PRV have some DNA of this virus incorporated into the plant's DNA. As of 2010, 80% of Hawaiian papaya plants were genetically modified. The modifications were made by University of Hawaiʻi scientists, who made the modified seeds available to farmers without charge.

In transgenic papaya, resistance is produced by inserting the viral coat protein gene into the plant's genome. Doing so seems to cause a similar protective reaction in the plant to cross-protection, which involves using an attenuated virus to protect against a more dangerous strain. Conventional varieties of transgenic papaya has reduced resistance against heterologous (not closely related to the coat gene source) strains, forcing different localities to develop their own transgenic varieties. As of 2016, one transgenic line appears able to deal with three different heterologous strains in addition to its source.

=== Production ===
Papaya production 2024, millions of tonnes
India	5.29
Dominican Republic	1.94
Indonesia	1.21
Brazil	1.15
Mexico	1.14
World	14.65
Source: FAOSTAT of the United Nations

In 2024, world production of papayas was 15 million tonnes, led by India with 36% of the total (table).

Global papaya production grew significantly over the early 21st century, mainly as a result of increased production in India and demand by the United States. The United States is the largest importer of papayas worldwide.

In South Africa, papaya orchards yield up to 100 tonnes of fruit per hectare.

Production of papayas

Papaya yield

== Toxicity ==
Papaya releases a latex fluid when not ripe, possibly causing irritation and an allergic reaction in some people. Because the enzyme papain acts as an allergen in sensitive individuals, meat that has been tenderized with it may induce an allergic reaction.

== Culinary use ==
The ripe fruit of the papaya is usually eaten raw, without skin or seeds. The black seeds are edible and have a sharp, spicy taste. The unripe green fruit is usually cooked due to its latex content.

Both green papaya fruit and its latex are rich in papain, a cysteine protease used for tenderizing meat and other proteins, as practiced currently by indigenous Americans, people of the Caribbean region, Pacific Islands, and the Philippines. It is included as a component in some powdered meat tenderizers. Papaya is not suitable for foods which set due to gelatin (such as jelly or aspic) because the enzymatic properties of papain prevent gelatin from setting.

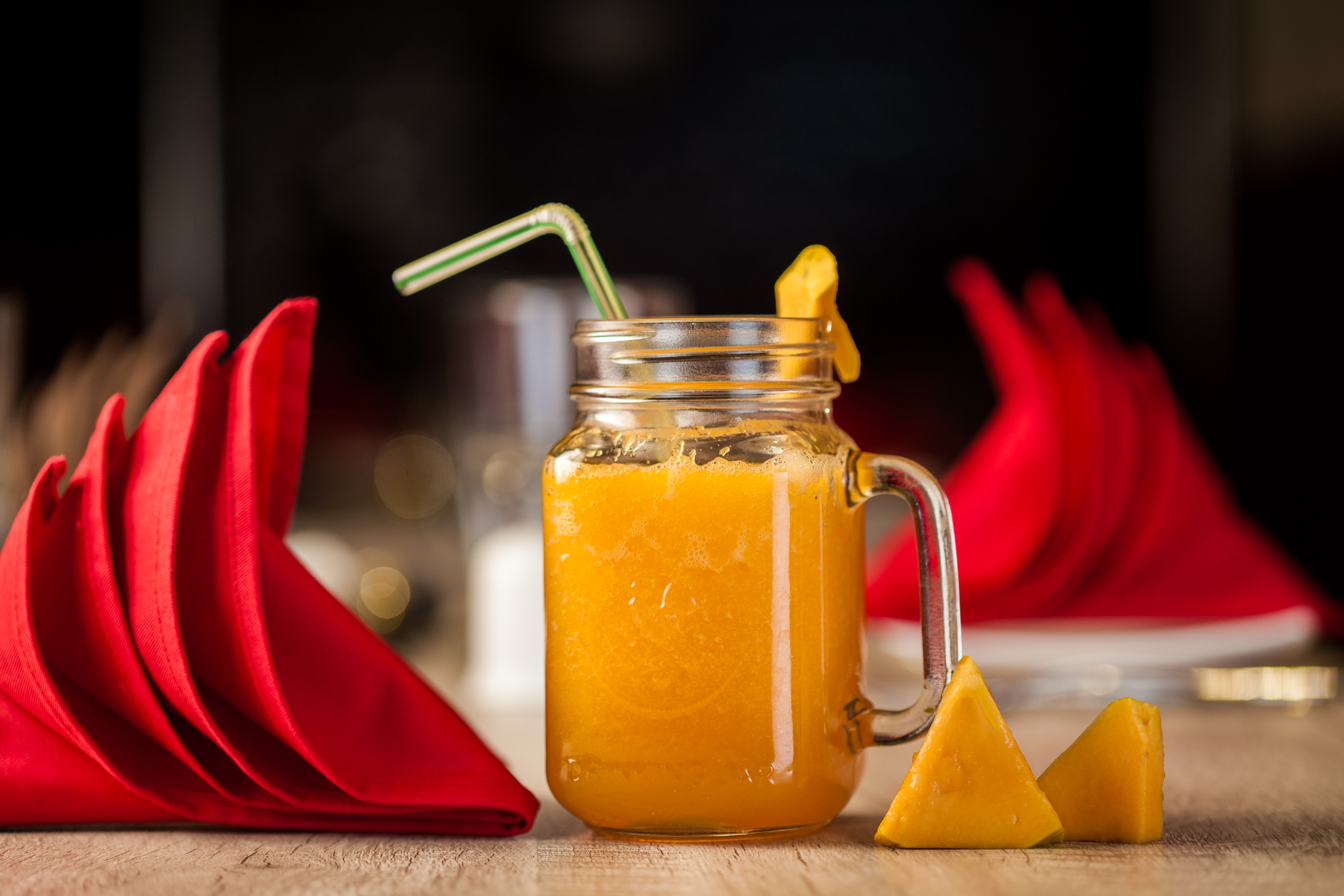
Papaya juice

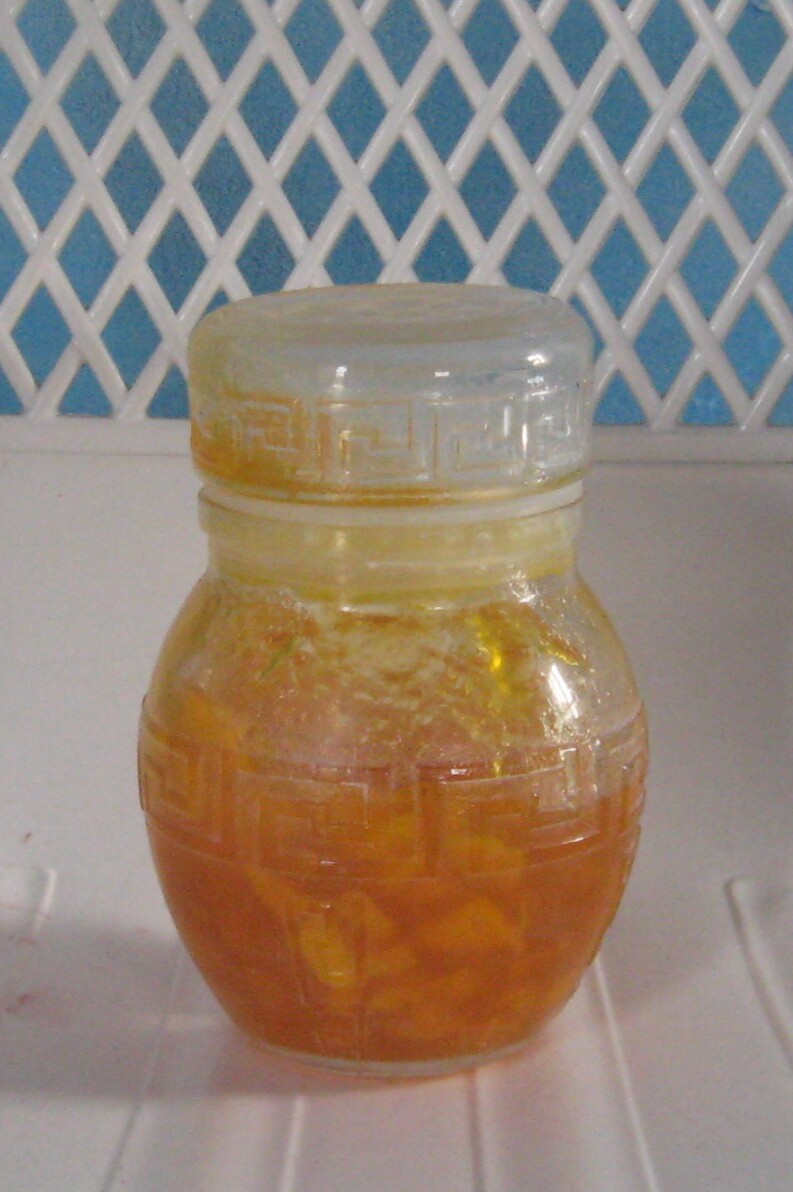
Papaya jam from Senegal

=== Nutrition ===
Papayas, raw
Nutritional value per 100 g (3.5 oz)
- Energy: 179 kJ (43 kcal)
- Carbohydrates: 10.82 g
- Sugars: 7.82 g
- Dietary fiber: 1.7 g
- Fat: 0.26 g
- Protein: 0.47 g
Vitamins and minerals
Vitamins	Quantity %DV^{†}
Vitamin A equiv. beta-Carotene lutein zeaxanthin	5% 47 μg 3% 274 μg 89 μg
Thiamine (B1)	2% 0.023 mg
Riboflavin (B2)	2% 0.027 mg
Niacin (B3)	2% 0.357 mg
Pantothenic acid (B5)	4% 0.191 mg
Vitamin B6	2% 0.038 mg
Folate (B9)	10% 38 μg
Vitamin C	69% 62 mg
Vitamin E	2% 0.3 mg
Vitamin K	2% 2.6 μg
Minerals	Quantity %DV^{†}
Calcium	2% 20 mg
Iron	1% 0.25 mg
Magnesium	5% 21 mg
Manganese	2% 0.04 mg
Phosphorus	1% 10 mg
Potassium	6% 182 mg
Sodium	0% 8 mg
Zinc	1% 0.08 mg
- Other constituents: Quantity
- Water: 88 g
- Lycopene: 1828 µg
- Full Link to USDA Database entry
- ^{†}Percentages estimated using US recommendations for adults, except for potassium, which is estimated based on expert recommendation from the National Academies.

Raw papaya pulp is 88% water, 11% carbohydrates, and contains negligible fat and protein (table). In a reference amount of 100 g (3.5 oz), papaya fruit provides 43 kilocalories and is a significant source of vitamin C (69% of the Daily Value, DV) and a moderate source of folate (10% DV), but otherwise has a low content of micronutrients (table).

=== Asia and the Pacific ===
Green papaya is used in Southeast Asian cooking, both raw and cooked. In some parts of Asia, the young leaves of the papaya are steamed and eaten like spinach.

In Myanmar, the unripe papaya are cut into slices and dipped into sour, fermented, or spicy seasonings and dips. In Myanmar and Thai recipes, the unripe papaya are cut into thinner slices to make papaya salad. The reason the unripe papaya is used is because of the firmer and crunchier texture.

Papayas became a part of Filipino cuisine after being introduced to the islands via the Manila galleons. Unripe or nearly ripe papayas (with orange flesh but still hard and green) are julienned and are commonly pickled into atchara, which is ubiquitous as a side dish to salty dishes. Nearly ripe papayas can also be eaten fresh as ensaladang papaya (papaya salad) or cubed and eaten dipped in vinegar or salt. Green papaya is also a common ingredient or filling in various savory dishes such as okoy, tinola, ginataan, lumpia, and empanada, especially in the cuisines of northern Luzon.

In Indonesian cuisine, the unripe green fruits and young leaves are boiled for use as part of lalab salad, while the flower buds are sautéed and stir-fried with chilies and green tomatoes as Minahasan papaya flower vegetable dish.

In Lao and Thai cuisine, unripe green papayas are used to make a type of spicy salad known in Laos as tam maak hoong or tam som and in Thailand as som tam. It is also used in Thai curries, such as kaeng som.

In Samoa where the fruit was introduced in 1839 via Tonga (name in Samoan: ʻesi), it is blended with local cocoa to make a special pudding called koko ʻesi.

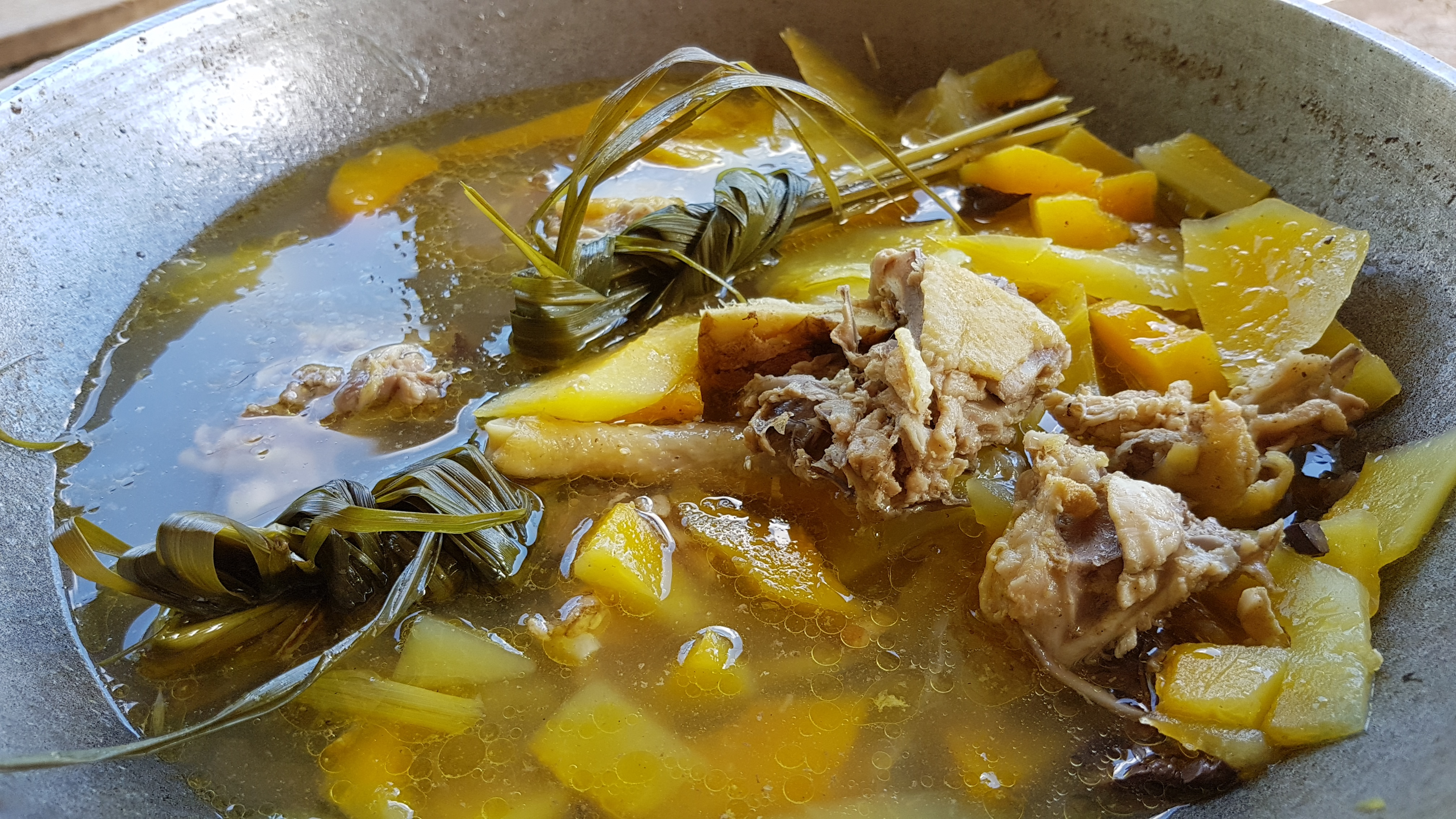
Green papaya is a traditional main ingredient of tinola in the Philippines.

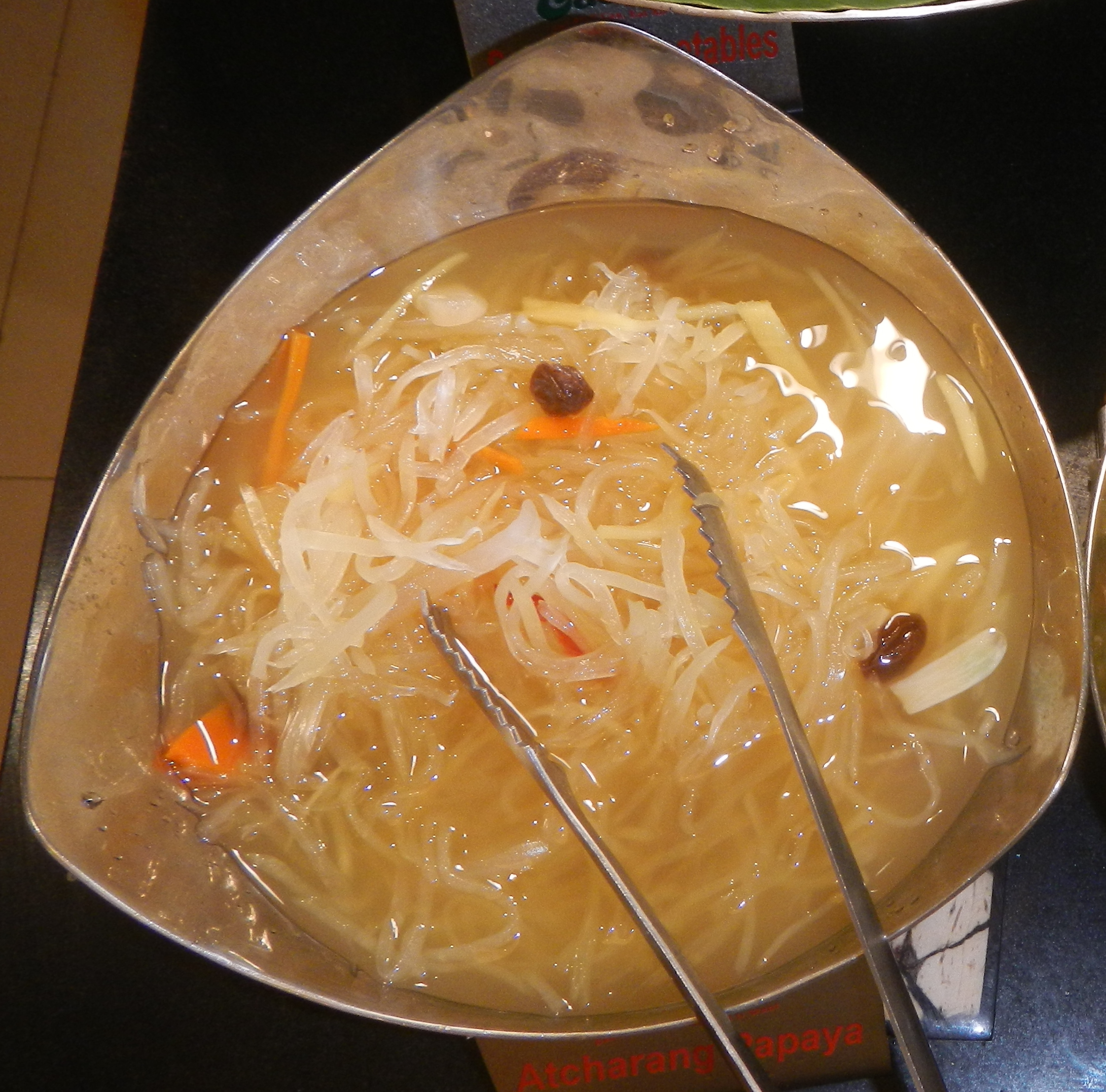
Atchara, Filipino pickled green papayas

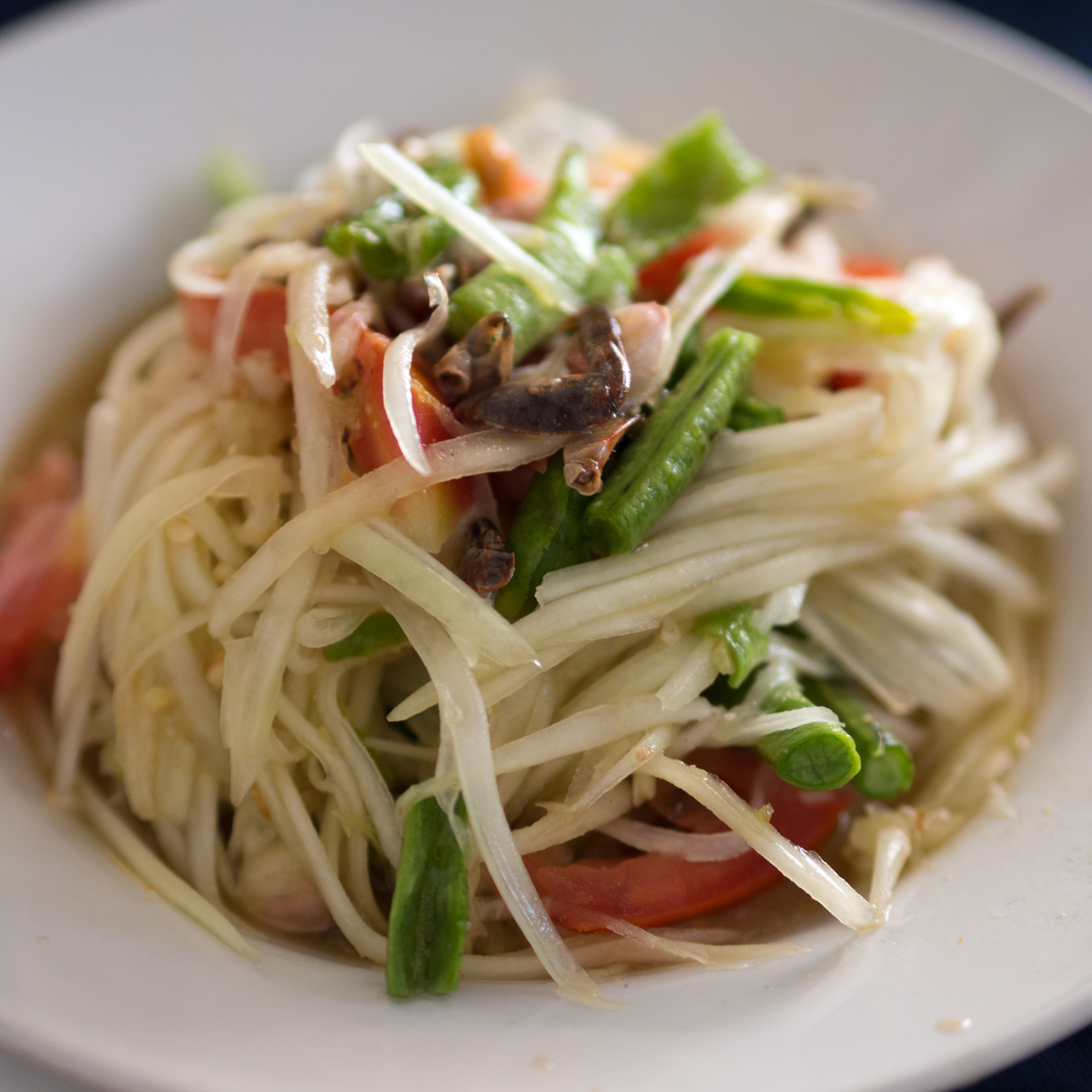
Som tam, Thai green papaya salad

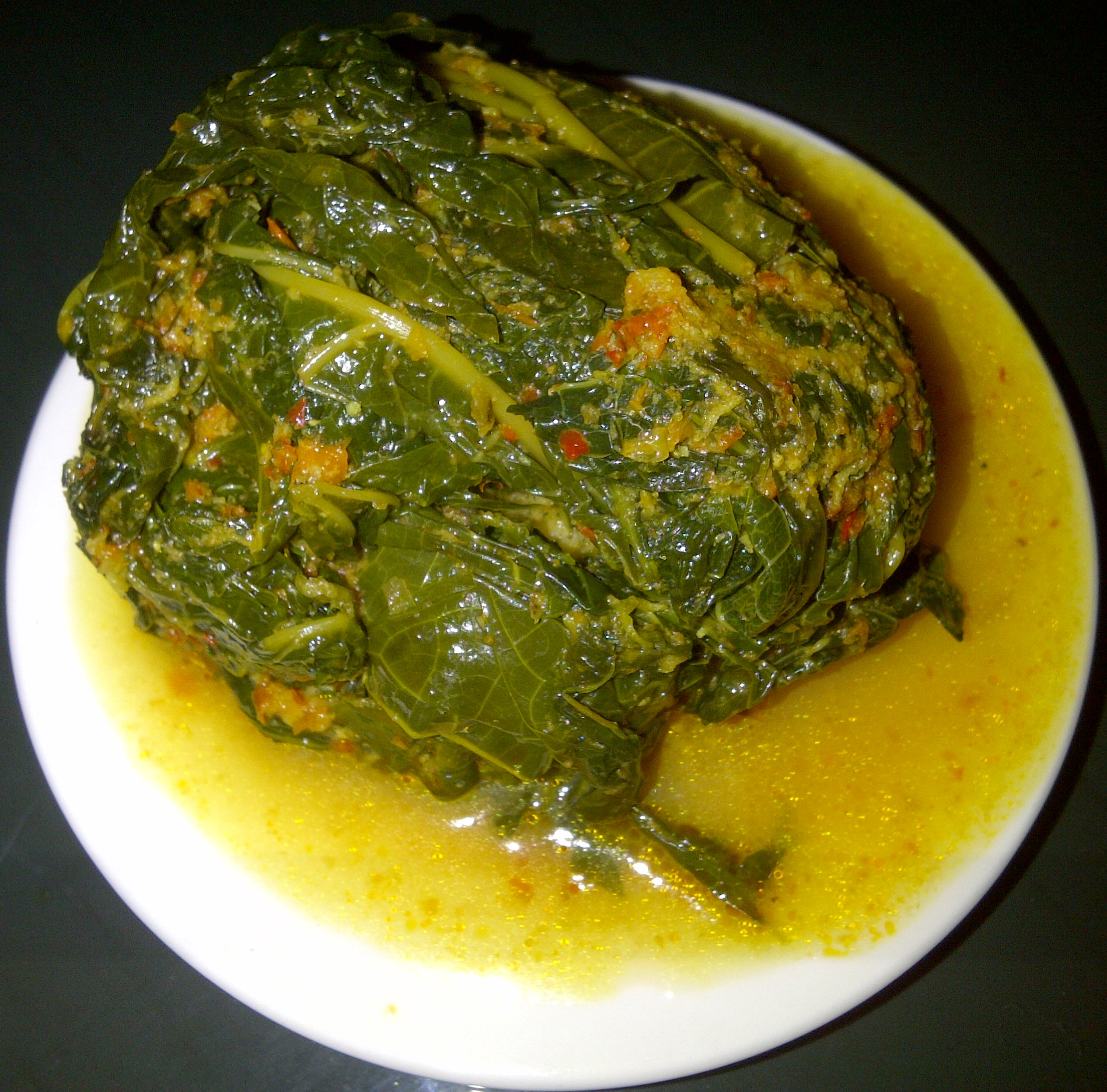
Buntil, Javanese anchovies wrapped in papaya leaves

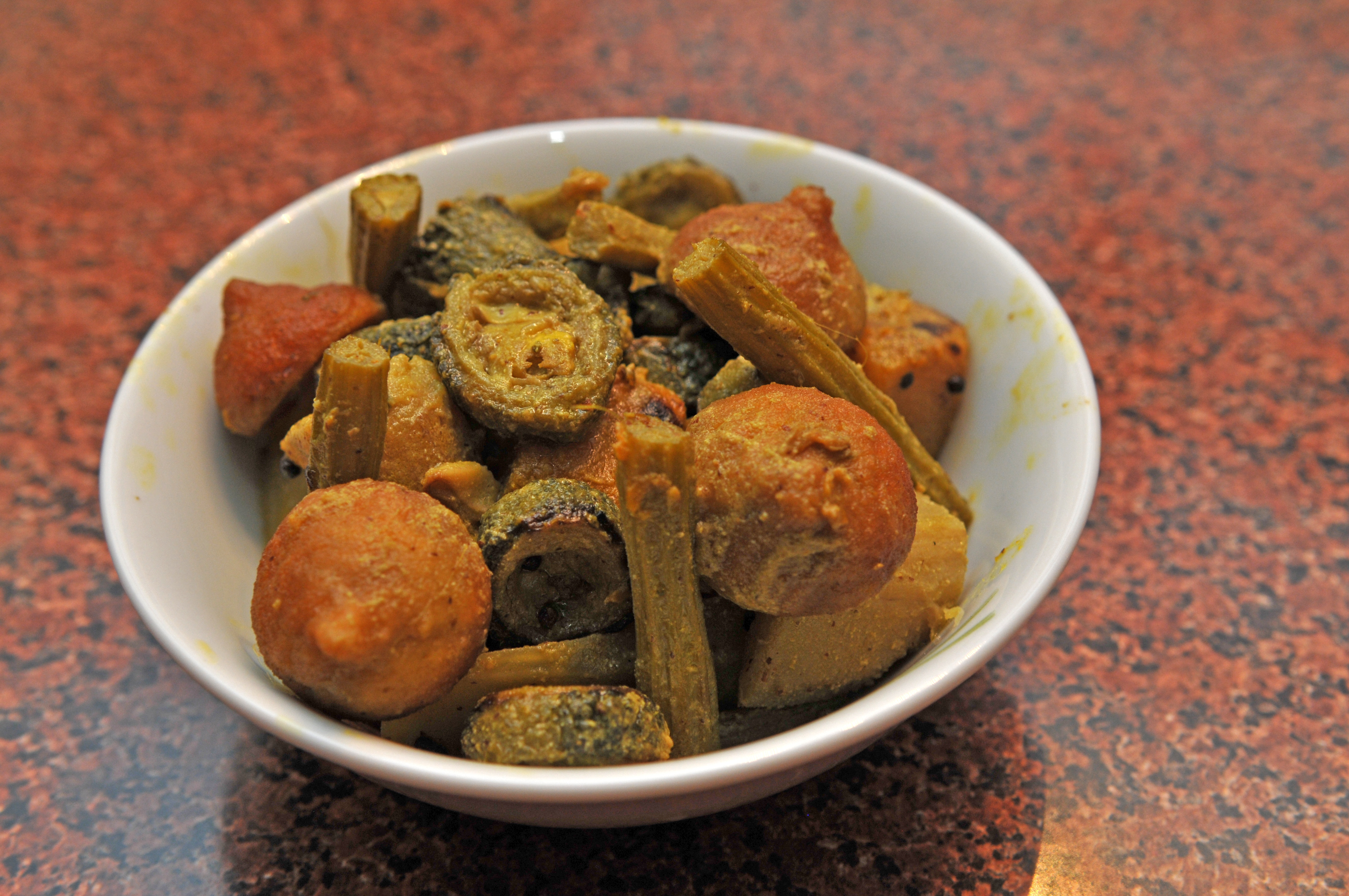
Sukto, Bengali dish with bitter gourd, drumstick (fruit), papaya, potato, and pumpkin

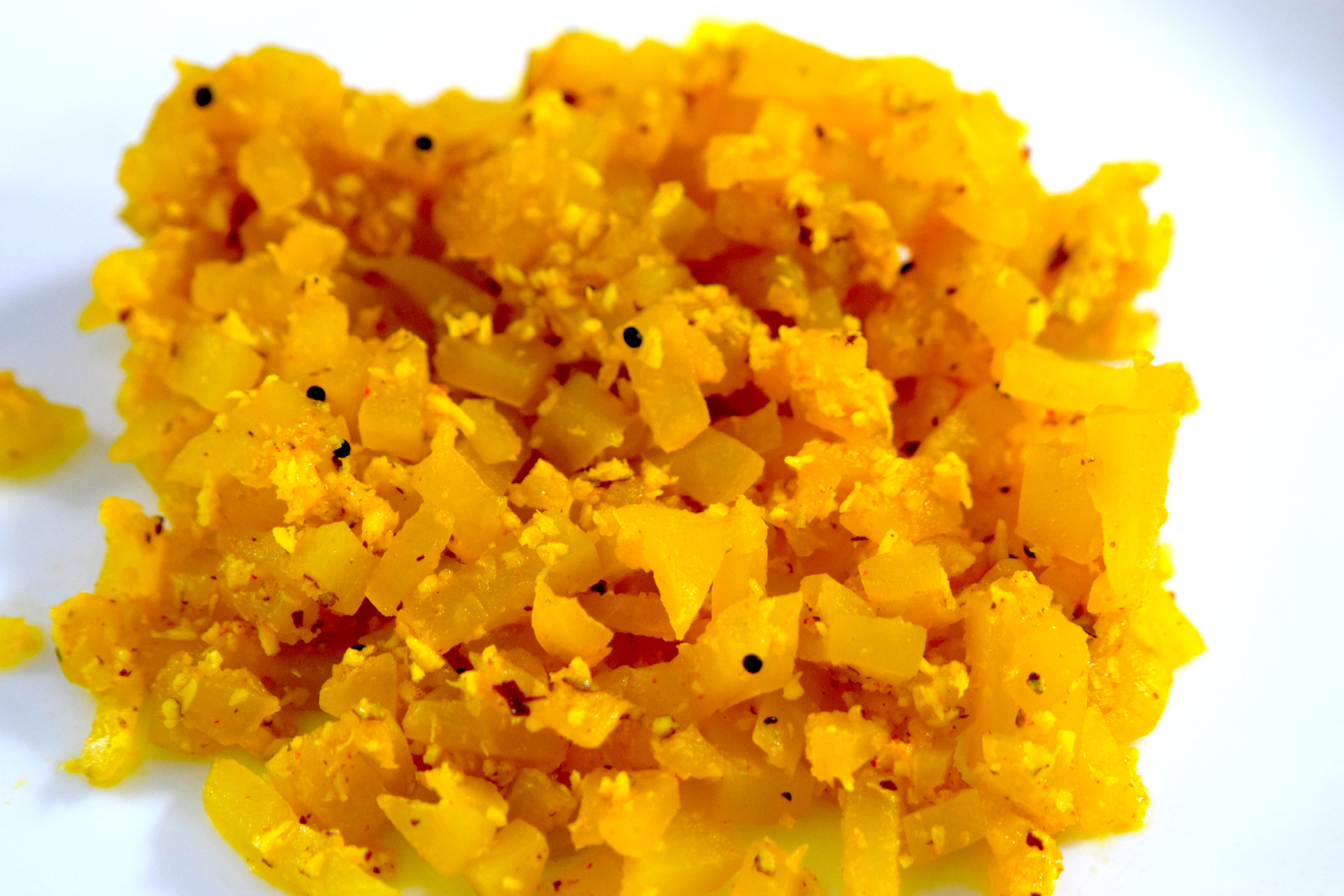
Pappaya Thoran, Kerala dish with papaya and scraped coconut fried in coconut oil.

=== South America ===
In Brazil and Paraguay, the unripe fruits are used to make sweets or preserves.

== Traditional medicine ==
In traditional medicine, papaya leaves are thought to be useful for treating malaria, as an abortifacient, purgative, smoked to relieve asthma, or as a decoction in Caribbean regions during the 20th century.

== See also ==
- Babaco
