= Toxotrypana =

- Toxotrypana curvicauda

Scientific classification
- Kingdom: Animalia
- Phylum: Arthropoda
- Class: Insecta
- Order: Diptera
- Family: Tephritidae
- Tribe: Toxotrypanini
- Genus: Toxotrypana

Genus of flies

Toxotrypana is an obsolete genus of tephritid or fruit flies in the family Tephritidae, now Anastrepha
