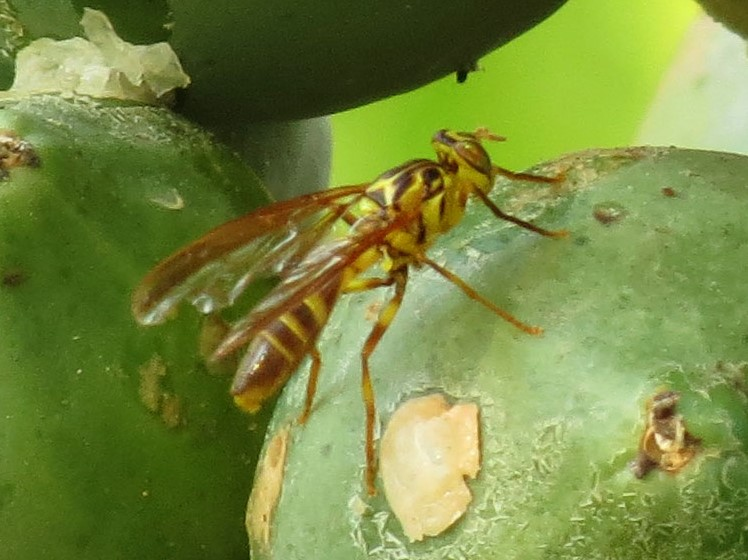

Scientific classification
- Domain: Eukaryota
- Kingdom: Animalia
- Phylum: Arthropoda
- Class: Insecta
- Order: Diptera
- Family: Tephritidae
- Tribe: Toxotrypanini
- Genus: Toxotrypana
- Species: T. curvicauda

Binomial name
- Toxotrypana curvicauda Gerstaecker, 1860

Synonyms
- Mikimyia furcifera Bigot, 1884; Toxotrypana fairbatesi Munro, 1984

= Toxotrypana curvicauda =

Species of fly

Toxotrypana curvicauda, the papaya fruit fly, is a species of fruit fly in the family Tephritidae.
