= Ictericodes japonicus =

Scientific classification
- Kingdom: Animalia
- Phylum: Arthropoda
- Clade: Pancrustacea
- Class: Insecta
- Order: Diptera
- Family: Tephritidae
- Subfamily: Tephritinae
- Tribe: Xyphosiini
- Genus: Ictericodes
- Species: I. japonicus

Binomial name
- Ictericodes japonicus (Wiedemann, 1830)

Synonyms
- Trypeta japonica Wiedemann, 1830; Trypeta schneideri Loew, 1856

Species of fly

Ictericodes japonicus is a species of tephritid or fruit flies in the genus Ictericodes of the family Tephritidae.

== Distribution ==
Central & East Europe to Caucasus & Central Asia, Japan.
