= Ictericodes zelleri =

Scientific classification
- Kingdom: Animalia
- Phylum: Arthropoda
- Class: Insecta
- Order: Diptera
- Family: Tephritidae
- Subfamily: Tephritinae
- Tribe: Xyphosiini
- Genus: Ictericodes
- Species: I. zelleri

Binomial name
- Ictericodes zelleri (Loew, 1844)

Synonyms
- Trypeta zelleri Loew, 1844; Trupanea myodes Schrank, 1803

Species of fly

Ictericodes zelleri is a species of tephritid or fruit flies in the genus Ictericodes of the family Tephritidae.

== Distribution ==
France, Switzerland, Poland, Czech Republic, Slovakia, Austria, Hungary.
