= Xyphosia laticauda =

Scientific classification
- Kingdom: Animalia
- Phylum: Arthropoda
- Class: Insecta
- Order: Diptera
- Family: Tephritidae
- Subfamily: Tephritinae
- Tribe: Xyphosiini
- Genus: Xyphosia
- Species: X. laticauda

Binomial name
- Xyphosia laticauda (Meigen, 1826)

Synonyms
- Trypeta laticauda Meigen, 1826; Trypeta schaefferi Frauenfeld, 1857; Trypeta schafferi Frauenfeld, 1857; Xyphosia schefferi Schiner, 1858

Species of fly

Xyphosia laticauda is a species of tephritid or fruit flies in the genus Xyphosia of the family Tephritidae.

== Distribution ==
France, Switzerland, Austria, Hungary, Ukraine, Armenia.
