= Xyphosia punctigera =

Scientific classification
- Kingdom: Animalia
- Phylum: Arthropoda
- Class: Insecta
- Order: Diptera
- Family: Tephritidae
- Subfamily: Tephritinae
- Tribe: Xyphosiini
- Genus: Xyphosia
- Species: X. punctigera

Binomial name
- Xyphosia punctigera (Coquillett, 1898)

Synonyms
- Tephritis punctigera Coquillett, 1898

Species of fly

Xyphosia punctigera is a species of tephritid or fruit flies in the genus Xyphosia of the family Tephritidae.

== Distribution ==
Russia, Korea, Japan.
