= Gymnocarena defoei =

Scientific classification
- Kingdom: Animalia
- Phylum: Arthropoda
- Clade: Pancrustacea
- Class: Insecta
- Order: Diptera
- Family: Tephritidae
- Subfamily: Tephritinae
- Tribe: Xyphosiini
- Genus: Gymnocarena
- Species: G. defoei

Binomial name
- Gymnocarena defoei Sutton & Steck, 2012

Species of fly

Gymnocarena defoei is a species of tephritid or fruit flies in the genus Gymnocarena of the family Tephritidae.
