= Gymnocarena mexicana =

Scientific classification
- Kingdom: Animalia
- Phylum: Arthropoda
- Class: Insecta
- Order: Diptera
- Family: Tephritidae
- Subfamily: Tephritinae
- Tribe: Xyphosiini
- Genus: Gymnocarena
- Species: G. mexicana

Binomial name
- Gymnocarena mexicana (Aczél, 1954)

Synonyms
- Tomoplagiodes mexicana Aczél, 1954

Species of fly

Gymnocarena mexicana is a species of tephritid or fruit flies in the genus Gymnocarena of the family Tephritidae.

== Distribution ==
Mexico.
