= Icterica circinata =

Scientific classification
- Kingdom: Animalia
- Phylum: Arthropoda
- Class: Insecta
- Order: Diptera
- Family: Tephritidae
- Subfamily: Tephritinae
- Tribe: Xyphosiini
- Genus: Icterica
- Species: I. circinata

Binomial name
- Icterica circinata (Loew, 1873)

Synonyms
- Trypeta circinata Loew, 1873

Species of fly

Icterica circinata is a species of tephritid or fruit flies in the genus Icterica of the family Tephritidae.

== Distribution ==
Canada, United States.
