= Xyphosia malaisei =

Scientific classification
- Kingdom: Animalia
- Phylum: Arthropoda
- Class: Insecta
- Order: Diptera
- Family: Tephritidae
- Subfamily: Tephritinae
- Tribe: Xyphosiini
- Genus: Xyphosia
- Species: X. malaisei

Binomial name
- Xyphosia malaisei Hering, 1938

Species of fly

Xyphosia malaisei is a species of tephritid or fruit flies in the genus Xyphosia of the family Tephritidae.

See revised combination Sundaresta malaisei (Hering, 1938) in Hancock & McGuire 2002

== Distribution ==
Myanmar, Thailand, Laos.
