= Gymnocarena mississippiensis =

Scientific classification
- Kingdom: Animalia
- Phylum: Arthropoda
- Class: Insecta
- Order: Diptera
- Family: Tephritidae
- Subfamily: Tephritinae
- Tribe: Xyphosiini
- Genus: Gymnocarena
- Species: G. mississippiensis

Binomial name
- Gymnocarena mississippiensis Norrbom, 1992

Species of fly

Gymnocarena mississippiensis is a species of fruit fly in the genus Gymnocarena of the family Tephritidae, that lives in the United States.
