= Ictericodes changhyoi =

Scientific classification
- Kingdom: Animalia
- Phylum: Arthropoda
- Clade: Pancrustacea
- Class: Insecta
- Order: Diptera
- Family: Tephritidae
- Subfamily: Tephritinae
- Tribe: Xyphosiini
- Genus: Ictericodes
- Species: I. changhyoi

Binomial name
- Ictericodes changhyoi Kwon, 1985

Species of fly

Ictericodes changhyoi is a species of tephritid or fruit flies in the genus Ictericodes of the family Tephritidae.

== Distribution ==
Ictericodes changhyoi is found in Korea.
