= Epochrinopsis bicolorata =

Scientific classification
- Kingdom: Animalia
- Phylum: Arthropoda
- Class: Insecta
- Order: Diptera
- Family: Tephritidae
- Subfamily: Tephritinae
- Tribe: Xyphosiini
- Genus: Epochrinopsis
- Species: E. bicolorata

Binomial name
- Epochrinopsis bicolorata Hering, 1939

Species of fly

Epochrinopsis bicolorata is a species of tephritid or fruit flies in the genus Epochrinopsis of the family Tephritidae.

== Distribution ==
Bolivia.
