= Ictericodes cashmerensis =

Scientific classification
- Kingdom: Animalia
- Phylum: Arthropoda
- Class: Insecta
- Order: Diptera
- Family: Tephritidae
- Subfamily: Tephritinae
- Tribe: Xyphosiini
- Genus: Ictericodes
- Species: I. cashmerensis

Binomial name
- Ictericodes cashmerensis (Hendel, 1927)

Synonyms
- Icterica cashmerensis Hendel, 1927

Species of fly

Ictericodes cashmerensis is a species of tephritid or fruit flies in the genus Ictericodes of the family Tephritidae.

== Distribution ==
India.
