= Ictericodes depuncta =

Scientific classification
- Kingdom: Animalia
- Phylum: Arthropoda
- Class: Insecta
- Order: Diptera
- Family: Tephritidae
- Subfamily: Tephritinae
- Tribe: Xyphosiini
- Genus: Ictericodes
- Species: I. depuncta

Binomial name
- Ictericodes depuncta (Hering, 1936)

Synonyms
- Icterica depuncta Hering, 1936; Acinia depunctata Chen, 1938

Species of fly

Ictericodes depuncta is a species of tephritid or fruit flies in the genus Ictericodes of the family Tephritidae.

== Distribution ==
Russia, China.
