= Gymnocarena lichtensteinii =

Scientific classification
- Kingdom: Animalia
- Phylum: Arthropoda
- Class: Insecta
- Order: Diptera
- Family: Tephritidae
- Subfamily: Tephritinae
- Tribe: Xyphosiini
- Genus: Gymnocarena
- Species: G. lichtensteinii

Binomial name
- Gymnocarena lichtensteinii (Wiedemann, 1830)

Synonyms
- Trypeta lichtensteinii Wiedemann, 1830; Icterica lichtensteini Aczél, 1950

Species of fly

Gymnocarena lichtensteinii is a species of tephritid or fruit flies in the genus Gymnocarena of the family Tephritidae.

== Distribution ==
Mexico.
