= Xyphosia conspicua =

Scientific classification
- Kingdom: Animalia
- Phylum: Arthropoda
- Class: Insecta
- Order: Diptera
- Family: Tephritidae
- Subfamily: Tephritinae
- Tribe: Xyphosiini
- Genus: Xyphosia
- Species: X. conspicua

Binomial name
- Xyphosia conspicua (Loew, 1869)

Synonyms
- Oxyphora conspicua Loew, 1869

Species of fly

Xyphosia circinata is a species of tephritid or fruit flies in the genus Xyphosia of the family Tephritidae.

== Distribution ==
Turkey, Caucasus.
