= Gymnocarena monzoni =

Scientific classification
- Kingdom: Animalia
- Phylum: Arthropoda
- Class: Insecta
- Order: Diptera
- Family: Tephritidae
- Subfamily: Tephritinae
- Tribe: Xyphosiini
- Genus: Gymnocarena
- Species: G. monzoni

Binomial name
- Gymnocarena monzoni Sutton & Steck, 2012

Species of fly

Gymnocarena monzoni is a species of tephritid, or fruit flies, in the genus Gymnocarena of the family Tephritidae.

== Distribution ==
They are found in Guatemala.
