= Ictericodes maculatus =

Scientific classification
- Kingdom: Animalia
- Phylum: Arthropoda
- Class: Insecta
- Order: Diptera
- Family: Tephritidae
- Subfamily: Tephritinae
- Tribe: Xyphosiini
- Genus: Ictericodes
- Species: I. maculatus

Binomial name
- Ictericodes maculatus (Shiraki, 1933)

Synonyms
- Icterica maculatus Shiraki, 1933

Species of fly

Ictericodes maculatus is a species of tephritid or fruit flies in the genus Ictericodes of the family Tephritidae.

== Distribution ==
Taiwan.
