= Xyphosia orientalis =

Scientific classification
- Kingdom: Animalia
- Phylum: Arthropoda
- Class: Insecta
- Order: Diptera
- Family: Tephritidae
- Subfamily: Tephritinae
- Tribe: Xyphosiini
- Genus: Xyphosia
- Species: X. orientalis

Binomial name
- Xyphosia orientalis Hering, 1936

Synonyms
- Xyphosia miliaria ssp. orientalis Hering, 1936

Species of fly

Xyphosia orientalis is a species of tephritid or fruit flies in the genus Xyphosia of the family Tephritidae.

== Distribution ==
Poland, Ukraine, China.
