= Xyphosia punctipennis =

Scientific classification
- Kingdom: Animalia
- Phylum: Arthropoda
- Class: Insecta
- Order: Diptera
- Family: Tephritidae
- Subfamily: Tephritinae
- Tribe: Xyphosiini
- Genus: Xyphosia
- Species: X. punctipennis

Binomial name
- Xyphosia punctipennis Hendel, 1927

Synonyms
- Xyphosia miliaria var. punctipennis Hendel, 1927

Species of fly

Xyphosia punctipennis is a species of tephritid or fruit flies in the genus Xyphosia of the family Tephritidae.

== Distribution ==
Kazakhstan, Central Asia.
