= Gymnocarena apicata =

Scientific classification
- Kingdom: Animalia
- Phylum: Arthropoda
- Class: Insecta
- Order: Diptera
- Family: Tephritidae
- Subfamily: Tephritinae
- Tribe: Xyphosiini
- Genus: Gymnocarena
- Species: G. apicata

Binomial name
- Gymnocarena apicata (Thomas, 1914)

Synonyms
- Urellia apicata Thomas, 1914

Species of fly

Gymnocarena apicata is a species of tephritid or fruit flies in the genus Gymnocarena of the family Tephritidae.

== Distribution ==
United States.
