= Gymnocarena diffusa =

Scientific classification
- Kingdom: Animalia
- Phylum: Arthropoda
- Class: Insecta
- Order: Diptera
- Family: Tephritidae
- Subfamily: Tephritinae
- Tribe: Xyphosiini
- Genus: Gymnocarena
- Species: G. diffusa

Binomial name
- Gymnocarena diffusa (Snow, 1894)

Synonyms
- Oedicarena diffusa Snow, 1894; Strauzia diffusia Cresson, 1907

Species of fly

Gymnocarena diffusa is a species of tephritid or fruit flies in the genus Gymnocarena of the family Tephritidae.

== Distribution ==
Canada & United States.
