= Gymnocarena =

Scientific classification
- Kingdom: Animalia
- Phylum: Arthropoda
- Class: Insecta
- Order: Diptera
- Family: Tephritidae
- Subfamily: Tephritinae
- Tribe: Xyphosiini
- Genus: Gymnocarena; Hering, 1940

Type species
- Oedicarena diffusa Snow, 1894

Synonyms
- Mylogymnocarena Foote, 1960; Tomoplagiodes Aczél, 1954

Genus of flies

Epochrinopsis is a genus in the family Tephritidae, commonly known as fruit flies.

== Species ==
- Gymnocarena angusta Norrbom, 1992
- Gymnocarena apicata (Thomas, 1914)
- Gymnocarena bicolor Foote, 1960
- Gymnocarena carinata Norrbom, 1992
- Gymnocarena defoei Sutton & Steck, 2012
- Gymnocarena diffusa (Snow, 1894)
- Gymnocarena fusca Norrbom, 1992
- Gymnocarena hernandezi Norrbom, 1992
- Gymnocarena lichtensteinii (Wiedemann, 1830)
- Gymnocarena magna Norrbom, 1992
- Gymnocarena mexicana (Aczél, 1954)
- Gymnocarena mississippiensis Norrbom, 1992
- Gymnocarena monzoni Sutton, Steck & Norrbom, 2012
- Gymnocarena norrbomi Steck & Sutton, 2012
- Gymnocarena serrata Norrbom, 1992
- Gymnocarena tricolor (Doane, 1899)
