= Icterica =

Scientific classification
- Kingdom: Animalia
- Phylum: Arthropoda
- Class: Insecta
- Order: Diptera
- Family: Tephritidae
- Subfamily: Tephritinae
- Tribe: Xyphosiini
- Genus: Icterica; Loew, 1873

Type species
- Trypeta circinata Loew, 1873

Genus of flies

Icterica is a genus of the family Tephritidae, better known as fruit flies.

== Species ==
- Icterica circinata (Loew, 1873)
- Icterica seriata (Loew, 1862)
