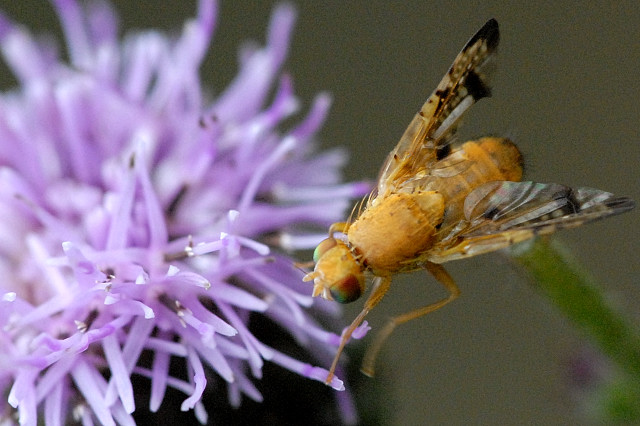
- Xyphosia miliaria, male

Scientific classification
- Kingdom: Animalia
- Phylum: Arthropoda
- Class: Insecta
- Order: Diptera
- Family: Tephritidae
- Subfamily: Tephritinae
- Tribe: Xyphosiini
- Genus: Xyphosia; Robineau-Desvoidy, 1830

Type species
- Xyphosia cirsiorum Robineau-Desvoidy, 1830

Synonyms
- Trichoxyphosia Hendel, 1927; Xiphosia Aczél, 1937

= Xyphosia =

Genus of flies

Xyphosia is a genus of the family Tephritidae, better known as fruit flies.

== Species ==
- Xyphosia conspicua (Loew, 1869)
- Xyphosia laticauda (Meigen, 1826)
- Xyphosia malaisei Hering, 1938
- Xyphosia miliaria (Schrank, 1781)
- Xyphosia orientalis Hering, 1936
- Xyphosia punctipennis Hendel, 1927
- Xyphosia punctigera (Coquillett, 1898)
