= Ictericodes =

Scientific classification
- Kingdom: Animalia
- Phylum: Arthropoda
- Class: Insecta
- Order: Diptera
- Family: Tephritidae
- Subfamily: Tephritinae
- Tribe: Xyphosiini
- Genus: Ictericodes; Hering, 1942

Type species
- Trypeta japonica Wiedemann, 1830

Genus of flies

Ictericodes is a genus of the family Tephritidae, better known as fruit flies.

== Species ==
- Ictericodes cashmerensis (Hendel, 1927)
- Ictericodes changhyoi Kwon, 1985
- Ictericodes depuncta (Hering, 1936)
- Ictericodes japonicus (Wiedemann, 1830)
- Ictericodes maculatus (Shiraki, 1933)
- Ictericodes zelleri (Loew, 1844)
