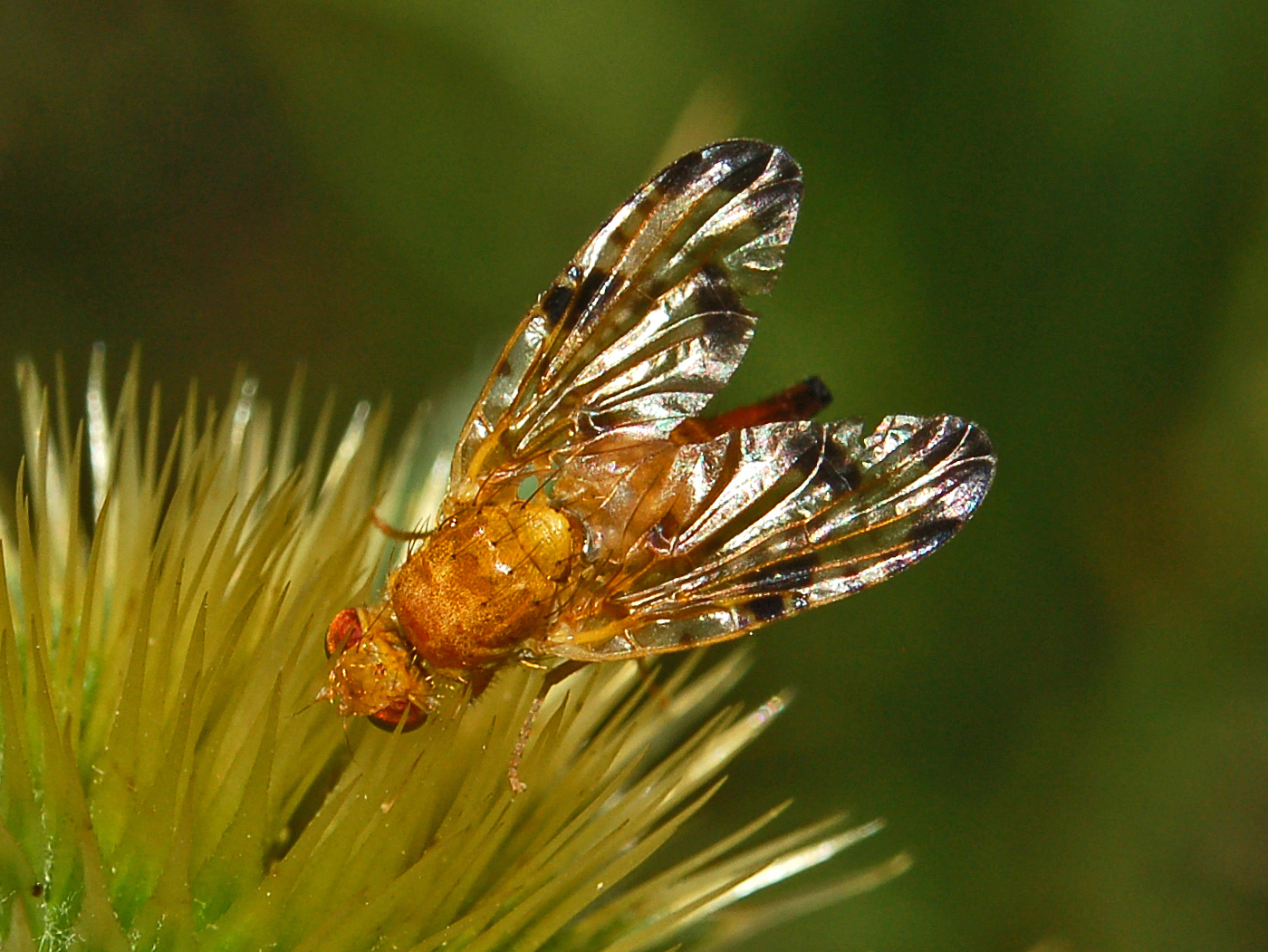
- Xyphosia miliaria, female

Scientific classification
- Kingdom: Animalia
- Phylum: Arthropoda
- Class: Insecta
- Order: Diptera
- Family: Tephritidae
- Subfamily: Tephritinae
- Tribe: Xyphosiini
- Genus: Xyphosia
- Species: X. miliaria

Binomial name
- Xyphosia miliaria (Schrank, 1781)

Synonyms
- Musca miliaria Schrank, 1781; Trypeta meridionalis Costa, 1854; Musca arcuata Fabricius, 1782; Xyphosia cirsiorum Robineau-Desvoidy, 1830; Trupanea sphaerocephali Schrank, 1803; Oxyphora miliara Becker, 1905; Xyphosia miliaria ssp. balcanica Drensky, 1943

= Xyphosia miliaria =

Species of fly

Xyphosia miliaria is a species of tephritid or fruit flies in the family Tephritidae.

== Distribution ==
This species is present in most of Europe, in the eastern Palearctic realm, and in the Near East.

== Habitat ==
This species occurs in wet meadows, in parks and gardens with the presence of thistles.

== Description ==
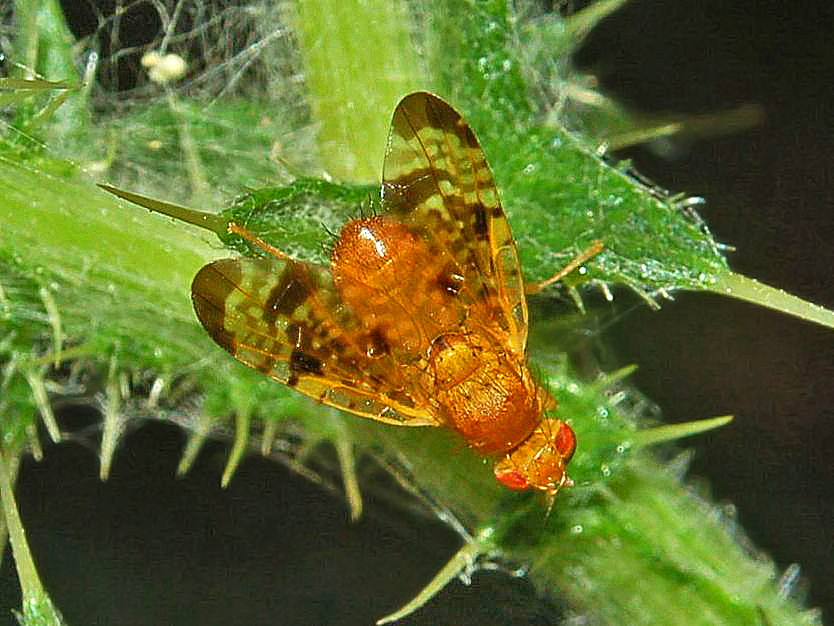
Male

Xyphosia miliaria may have a body length of 5–8 mm (0.2–0.3 in) and a wingspan of 15–18 mm (0.6–0.7 in) The thorax and the abdomen are yellowish, sparsely covered with long bristles and the mesonotum is longer than wide. The abdomen is round in males, elongated in the females and the females bear at the end of the abdomen a dark brown, pointed ovipositor. The large compound eyes are orange-red. The wings are decorated with distinctive dark apical and transversal drawings.

== Biology ==
The adults fly from May to September feeding on nectar and pollen of various flowering plants. Larvae develop on buds of thistles (Carduus nutans, Cirsium arvense, Cirsium palustre, Cirsium eriophorum).

== Gallery ==
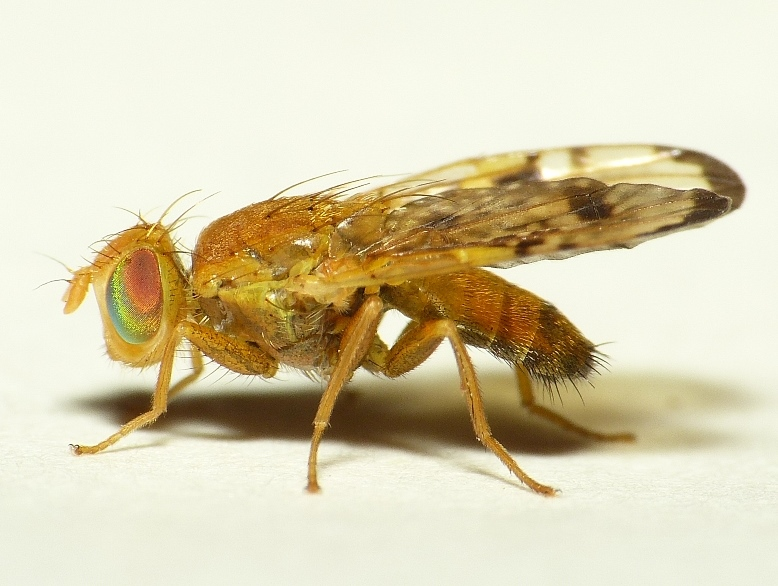
Side view

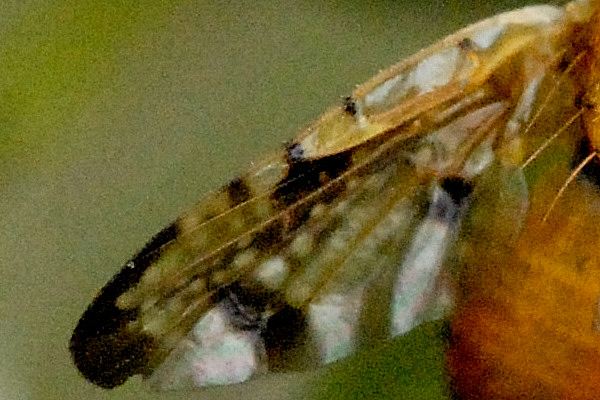
Wing detail

Oviposition (video clip)

Feeding on thistle (video clip)

== Bibliography ==
- Merz, B. - Faunistics of the Tephritidae of the Iberian Peninsula and the Baleares in Mitt. Schweiz. Entomol. Ges.
- Norrbom, A. L., Carroll, L. E., Thompson, F. C., White, I. M. & Freidberg, A. - Systematic database of names in Thompson, F. C. (Ed.) Fruit Fly Expert System and Systematic Information Database. Myia.
- Seguy, E. - F. Trypetidae in Faune de France. 28. Dipteres (Brachyceres) (Muscidae Acalypterae et Scatophagidae)
- White, I. M. - Tephritid flies (Diptera: Tephritidae) in Handbooks for the Identification of British Insects.10 (ser. 5a)
