= Epochrinopsis =

Scientific classification
- Kingdom: Animalia
- Phylum: Arthropoda
- Class: Insecta
- Order: Diptera
- Family: Tephritidae
- Subfamily: Tephritinae
- Tribe: Xyphosiini
- Genus: Epochrinopsis; Hering, 1939

Type species
- Epochrinopsis bicolorata Hering, 1939

Synonyms
- Epochrella Hering, 1961

Genus of flies

Epochrinopsis is a genus of the family Tephritidae, better known as fruit flies.

== Species ==
- Epochrinopsis bicolorata Hering, 1939
- Epochrinopsis rivellioides Hering, 1961
