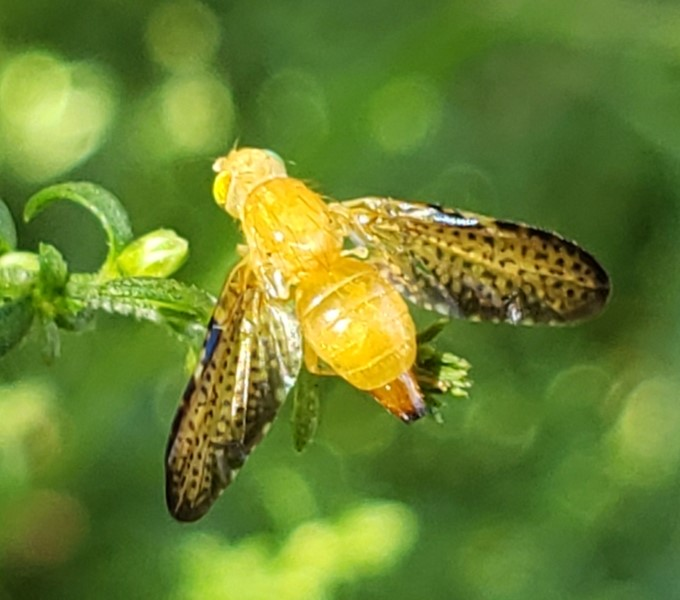

Scientific classification
- Kingdom: Animalia
- Phylum: Arthropoda
- Class: Insecta
- Order: Diptera
- Family: Tephritidae
- Genus: Icterica
- Species: I. seriata

Binomial name
- Icterica seriata (Loew, 1862)

Synonyms
- Trypeta seriata Loew, 1862; Icterica sericata Curran, 1934

= Icterica seriata =

Species of fly

Icterica seriata is a species of tephritid or fruit flies in the genus Icterica of the family Tephritidae.

== Distribution ==
Canada, United States.
