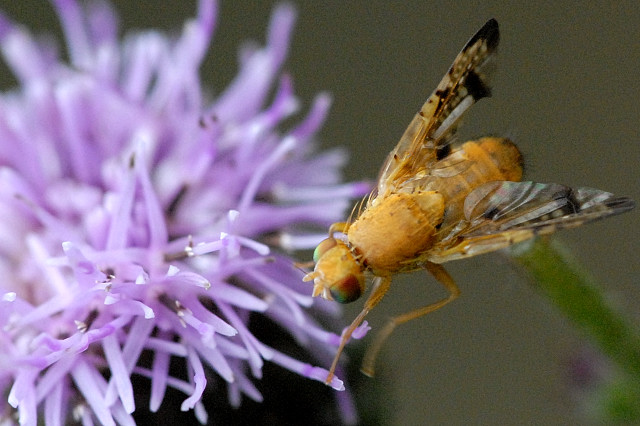
- Xyphosia miliaria

Scientific classification
- Kingdom: Animalia
- Phylum: Arthropoda
- Class: Insecta
- Order: Diptera
- Family: Tephritidae
- Subfamily: Tephritinae
- Tribe: Xyphosiini

= Xyphosiini =

Tribe of flies

Xyphosiini is a tribe of fruit flies in the family Tephritidae.

== Genera ==
- Epochrinopsis Hering, 1939
- Gymnocarena Hering, 1940
- Icterica Loew, 1873
- Ictericodes Hering, 1942
- Xyphosia Robineau-Desvoidy, 1830
