= Dasydorylas lamellifer =

Scientific classification
- Kingdom: Animalia
- Phylum: Arthropoda
- Clade: Pancrustacea
- Class: Insecta
- Order: Diptera
- Family: Pipunculidae
- Subfamily: Pipunculinae
- Tribe: Eudorylini
- Genus: Dasydorylas
- Species: D. lamellifer

Binomial name
- Dasydorylas lamellifer (Perkins, 1905)

Synonyms
- Pipunculus lamellifer Perkins, 1905; Pipunculus agamus Perkins, 1905; Pipunculus comitans Perkins, 1905

Species of fly

Dasydorylas lamellifer is a species of fly in the family Pipunculidae. It was first described by Robert Cyril Layton Perkins in 1905 as Pipunculus lamellifer.

== Taxonomy ==
Pipunculus agamus and Pipunculus comitans, both described by Perkins in 1905, were treated as junior synonyms of Pipunculus lamellifer by D. Elmo Hardy in 1964.

== Distribution ==
Dasydorylas lamellifer is known from Australia. The original material was recorded from the Cairns district of Queensland, including coastal and mountain localities.
