= Dasydorylas dorsalis =

Scientific classification
- Kingdom: Animalia
- Phylum: Arthropoda
- Clade: Pancrustacea
- Class: Insecta
- Order: Diptera
- Family: Pipunculidae
- Subfamily: Pipunculinae
- Tribe: Eudorylini
- Genus: Dasydorylas
- Species: D. dorsalis

Binomial name
- Dasydorylas dorsalis (Hardy, 1950)

Synonyms
- Dorilas dorsalis Hardy, 1950

Species of fly

Dasydorylas dorsalis is a species of fly in the family Pipunculidae. It was first described by D. Elmo Hardy in 1950 as Dorilas dorsalis.

== Distribution ==
Dasydorylas dorsalis was described from material collected during the G. F. de Witte mission to Albert National Park, now Virunga National Park, in the Democratic Republic of the Congo.
