= Dasydorylas nigripedes =

Scientific classification
- Kingdom: Animalia
- Phylum: Arthropoda
- Clade: Pancrustacea
- Class: Insecta
- Order: Diptera
- Family: Pipunculidae
- Subfamily: Pipunculinae
- Tribe: Eudorylini
- Genus: Dasydorylas
- Species: D. nigripedes

Binomial name
- Dasydorylas nigripedes (Hardy, 1954)

Synonyms
- Dorilas nigripedes Hardy, 1954

Species of fly

Dasydorylas nigripedes is a species of fly in the family Pipunculidae. It was first described by D. Elmo Hardy in 1954 as Dorilas nigripedes.

== Taxonomy ==
The species was later placed in the genus Dasydorylas, a genus established by Skevington and Yeates in 2001 for species formerly included in Eudorylas and related groups.

== Distribution ==
Dasydorylas nigripedes has been recorded from Brazil.
