= Dasydorylas infissus =

Scientific classification
- Kingdom: Animalia
- Phylum: Arthropoda
- Clade: Pancrustacea
- Class: Insecta
- Order: Diptera
- Family: Pipunculidae
- Subfamily: Pipunculinae
- Tribe: Eudorylini
- Genus: Dasydorylas
- Species: D. infissus

Binomial name
- Dasydorylas infissus (Hardy, 1968)

Synonyms
- Pipunculus infissus Hardy, 1968

Species of fly

Dasydorylas infissus is a species of fly in the family Pipunculidae. It was first described by D. Elmo Hardy in 1968 as Pipunculus infissus.

== Distribution ==
Dasydorylas infissus was described in Hardy's 1968 treatment of Pipunculidae from the Philippines and the Bismarck Archipelago.
