= Dasydorylas sordidatus =

Scientific classification
- Kingdom: Animalia
- Phylum: Arthropoda
- Clade: Pancrustacea
- Class: Insecta
- Order: Diptera
- Family: Pipunculidae
- Subfamily: Pipunculinae
- Tribe: Eudorylini
- Genus: Dasydorylas
- Species: D. sordidatus

Binomial name
- Dasydorylas sordidatus (Hardy, 1950)

Synonyms
- Dorilas (Eudorylas) sordidatus Hardy, 1950

Species of fly

Dasydorylas sordidatus is a species of fly in the family Pipunculidae. It was first described by D. Elmo Hardy in 1950 as Dorilas (Eudorylas) sordidatus.

== Distribution ==
Dasydorylas sordidatus has been recorded from Burundi, the Democratic Republic of the Congo and Kenya.
