= Dasydorylas eucalypti =

Scientific classification
- Kingdom: Animalia
- Phylum: Arthropoda
- Clade: Pancrustacea
- Class: Insecta
- Order: Diptera
- Family: Pipunculidae
- Subfamily: Pipunculinae
- Tribe: Eudorylini
- Genus: Dasydorylas
- Species: D. eucalypti

Binomial name
- Dasydorylas eucalypti (Perkins, 1905)

Synonyms
- Pipunculus eucalypti Perkins, 1905

Species of fly

Dasydorylas eucalypti is a species of fly in the family Pipunculidae. It was first described by Robert Cyril Layton Perkins in 1905 as Pipunculus eucalypti.

== Taxonomy ==
Pipunculus eucalypti was designated as the type species of the genus Dasydorylas when the genus was described by Skevington and Yeates in 2001.

== Distribution ==
Dasydorylas eucalypti is known from Australia. The original specimen was recorded from Bundaberg, Queensland, where it was bred from a jassid nymph on Eucalyptus.
