= Cephalops perkinsiellae =

Scientific classification
- Kingdom: Animalia
- Phylum: Arthropoda
- Clade: Pancrustacea
- Class: Insecta
- Order: Diptera
- Family: Pipunculidae
- Subfamily: Pipunculinae
- Tribe: Cephalopsini
- Genus: Cephalops
- Species: C. perkinsiellae

Binomial name
- Cephalops perkinsiellae (Hardy, 1953)

Synonyms
- Dorilas perkinsiellae Hardy, 1953

Species of fly

Cephalops perkinsiellae is a species of fly in the family Pipunculidae.

== Distribution ==
Hawaii
