= Dasydorylas setosilobus =

Scientific classification
- Kingdom: Animalia
- Phylum: Arthropoda
- Clade: Pancrustacea
- Class: Insecta
- Order: Diptera
- Family: Pipunculidae
- Subfamily: Pipunculinae
- Tribe: Eudorylini
- Genus: Dasydorylas
- Species: D. setosilobus

Binomial name
- Dasydorylas setosilobus (Hardy, 1972)

Synonyms
- Pipunculus setosilobus Hardy, 1972

Species of fly

Dasydorylas setosilobus is a species of fly in the family Pipunculidae. It was first described by D. Elmo Hardy in 1972 as Pipunculus setosilobus.

== Distribution ==
Dasydorylas setosilobus was described in Hardy's treatment of Pipunculidae from the Oriental region.
