= Dasydorylas fallax =

Scientific classification
- Kingdom: Animalia
- Phylum: Arthropoda
- Clade: Pancrustacea
- Class: Insecta
- Order: Diptera
- Family: Pipunculidae
- Subfamily: Pipunculinae
- Tribe: Eudorylini
- Genus: Dasydorylas
- Species: D. fallax

Binomial name
- Dasydorylas fallax (Perkins, 1905)

Synonyms
- Pipunculus fallax Perkins, 1905

Species of fly

Dasydorylas fallax is a species of fly in the family Pipunculidae. It was first described by Robert Cyril Layton Perkins in 1905 as Pipunculus fallax.

== Distribution ==
Dasydorylas fallax is known from Australia. The original specimen was recorded from Bundaberg, Queensland.
