= Allomethus rotundicornis =

Scientific classification
- Kingdom: Animalia
- Phylum: Arthropoda
- Clade: Pancrustacea
- Class: Insecta
- Order: Diptera
- Family: Pipunculidae
- Subfamily: Pipunculinae
- Tribe: Eudorylini
- Genus: Allomethus
- Species: A. rotundicornis

Binomial name
- Allomethus rotundicornis (Hardy, 1954)

Synonyms
- Dorilas rotundicornis Hardy, 1954

Species of insect

Allomethus rotundicornis is a species of fly in the family Pipunculidae. It was described by Hardy in 1954.

== Distribution ==
Brazil.
