= Dasydorylas quasidorsalis =

Scientific classification
- Kingdom: Animalia
- Phylum: Arthropoda
- Clade: Pancrustacea
- Class: Insecta
- Order: Diptera
- Family: Pipunculidae
- Subfamily: Pipunculinae
- Tribe: Eudorylini
- Genus: Dasydorylas
- Species: D. quasidorsalis

Binomial name
- Dasydorylas quasidorsalis (Hardy, 1961)

Synonyms
- Dorilas quasidorsalis Hardy, 1961

Species of fly

Dasydorylas quasidorsalis is a species of fly in the family Pipunculidae. It was first described by D. Elmo Hardy in 1961 as Dorilas quasidorsalis.

== Distribution ==
Dasydorylas quasidorsalis is known from Africa. Hardy described the species in his treatment of Diptera from Garamba National Park in the Democratic Republic of the Congo.
