= Dasydorylas dolichostigmus =

Scientific classification
- Kingdom: Animalia
- Phylum: Arthropoda
- Clade: Pancrustacea
- Class: Insecta
- Order: Diptera
- Family: Pipunculidae
- Subfamily: Pipunculinae
- Tribe: Eudorylini
- Genus: Dasydorylas
- Species: D. dolichostigmus

Binomial name
- Dasydorylas dolichostigmus (Perkins, 1905)

Synonyms
- Pipunculus dolichostigmus Perkins, 1905

Species of fly

Dasydorylas dolichostigmus is a species of fly in the family Pipunculidae. It was first described by Robert Cyril Layton Perkins in 1905 as Pipunculus dolichostigmus.

== Description ==
Perkins described the male as having a body length of about 4.75 mm. The original description noted a black thorax with fuscous tomentum, a pale brown wing stigma, mostly yellow tibiae and tarsi except for the apical tarsal joint, and a narrow elongate area on the hypopygium.

== Distribution ==
Dasydorylas dolichostigmus is known from Australia. The original specimen was recorded from Bundaberg, Queensland.
