= Dasydorylas gradus =

Scientific classification
- Kingdom: Animalia
- Phylum: Arthropoda
- Clade: Pancrustacea
- Class: Insecta
- Order: Diptera
- Family: Pipunculidae
- Subfamily: Pipunculinae
- Tribe: Eudorylini
- Genus: Dasydorylas
- Species: D. gradus

Binomial name
- Dasydorylas gradus Kehlmaier, 2005

Species of fly

Dasydorylas gradus is a species of fly in the family Pipunculidae. It was described by Christian Kehlmaier in 2005 from material collected in Israel.

== Distribution ==
Dasydorylas gradus has been recorded from Cyprus, Israel and Turkey.
