= Dasydorylas zardouei =

Scientific classification
- Kingdom: Animalia
- Phylum: Arthropoda
- Clade: Pancrustacea
- Class: Insecta
- Order: Diptera
- Family: Pipunculidae
- Subfamily: Pipunculinae
- Tribe: Eudorylini
- Genus: Dasydorylas
- Species: D. zardouei

Binomial name
- Dasydorylas zardouei Motamedinia & Kehlmaier, 2017

Species of fly

Dasydorylas zardouei is a species of fly in the family Pipunculidae. It was described in 2017 by Behnam Motamedinia and Christian Kehlmaier from material collected in Iran. The species was named after the collector of the holotype, M. Zardouei.

== Distribution ==
Dasydorylas zardouei is known from Iran. Specimens have been recorded from Dodan in Kermanshah province.
