= Dasydorylas discoidalis =

Scientific classification
- Kingdom: Animalia
- Phylum: Arthropoda
- Clade: Pancrustacea
- Class: Insecta
- Order: Diptera
- Family: Pipunculidae
- Subfamily: Pipunculinae
- Tribe: Eudorylini
- Genus: Dasydorylas
- Species: D. discoidalis

Binomial name
- Dasydorylas discoidalis (Becker, 1897)

Synonyms
- Pipunculus discoidalis Becker, 1897; Eudorylas discoidalis (Becker, 1897); Dasydorylas derafshani Motamedinia & Kehlmaier, 2017

Species of fly

Dasydorylas discoidalis is a species of fly in the family Pipunculidae. It was first described by Theodor Becker in 1897 as Pipunculus discoidalis.

== Taxonomy ==
Dasydorylas derafshani, described from Iran in 2017, was treated as a junior synonym of D. discoidalis by Motamedinia, Skevington and Kelso in 2020, based on molecular evidence.

== Description ==
Males of D. discoidalis can be distinguished from related species by separated compound eyes, a long posterior fringe of setae on the scutellum, evenly distributed setae on the abdominal tergites, and a phallic guide with eight downward-directed apical spines.

== Distribution ==
Dasydorylas discoidalis has been recorded from Iran, Israel, Russia and the United Arab Emirates.
