= Microcephalops opacus =

Scientific classification
- Kingdom: Animalia
- Phylum: Arthropoda
- Class: Insecta
- Order: Diptera
- Family: Pipunculidae
- Subfamily: Pipunculinae
- Tribe: Microcephalopsini
- Genus: Microcephalops
- Species: M. opacus

Binomial name
- Microcephalops opacus (Fallén, 1816)

Synonyms
- Cephalops opacus Fallén, 1816; Pipunculus vestitus Becker, 1900

Species of fly

Microcephalops opacus is a species of fly in the family Pipunculidae.

== Distribution ==
Europe.
