= Cephalops subultimus =

Scientific classification
- Kingdom: Animalia
- Phylum: Arthropoda
- Clade: Pancrustacea
- Class: Insecta
- Order: Diptera
- Family: Pipunculidae
- Subfamily: Pipunculinae
- Tribe: Cephalopsini
- Genus: Cephalops
- Species: C. subultimus

Binomial name
- Cephalops subultimus Collin, 1956

Species of fly

Cephalops subultimus is a species of fly in the family Pipunculidae.

== Distribution ==
Belgium, Great Britain, Czech Republic, Denmark, Estonia, Finland, Germany, Hungary, Ireland, Italy, Latvia, Russia, Norway, Slovakia, Spain, Sweden, Switzerland, Netherlands.
