= Cephalops obtusinervis =

Scientific classification
- Kingdom: Animalia
- Phylum: Arthropoda
- Clade: Pancrustacea
- Class: Insecta
- Order: Diptera
- Family: Pipunculidae
- Subfamily: Pipunculinae
- Tribe: Cephalopsini
- Genus: Cephalops
- Species: C. obtusinervis

Binomial name
- Cephalops obtusinervis (Zetterstedt, 1844)

Species of fly

Cephalops obtusinervis is a species of fly in the family Pipunculidae. It is found in the Palearctic.
