= Allomethus unicicolis =

Scientific classification
- Kingdom: Animalia
- Phylum: Arthropoda
- Clade: Pancrustacea
- Class: Insecta
- Order: Diptera
- Family: Pipunculidae
- Subfamily: Pipunculinae
- Tribe: Eudorylini
- Genus: Allomethus
- Species: A. unicicolis

Binomial name
- Allomethus unicicolis Skevington, 2002

Species of fly

Allomethus unicicolis is a species of fly in the family Pipunculidae. It was described by Skevington in 2002.

== Distribution ==
Australia.
