= Dasydorylas filiformis =

Scientific classification
- Kingdom: Animalia
- Phylum: Arthropoda
- Clade: Pancrustacea
- Class: Insecta
- Order: Diptera
- Family: Pipunculidae
- Subfamily: Pipunculinae
- Tribe: Eudorylini
- Genus: Dasydorylas
- Species: D. filiformis

Binomial name
- Dasydorylas filiformis Kehlmaier, 2005

Species of fly

Dasydorylas filiformis is a species of fly in the family Pipunculidae. It was described by Christian Kehlmaier in 2005.

== Distribution ==
Dasydorylas filiformis has been recorded from France. A 2021 checklist of the Pipunculidae of mainland France listed examined material from Saint-Remèze, Ardèche.
