= Cephalops ultimus =

Scientific classification
- Kingdom: Animalia
- Phylum: Arthropoda
- Clade: Pancrustacea
- Class: Insecta
- Order: Diptera
- Family: Pipunculidae
- Subfamily: Pipunculinae
- Tribe: Cephalopsini
- Genus: Cephalops
- Species: C. ultimus

Binomial name
- Cephalops ultimus (Becker, 1900)

Synonyms
- Pipunculus ultimus Becker, 1900

Species of fly

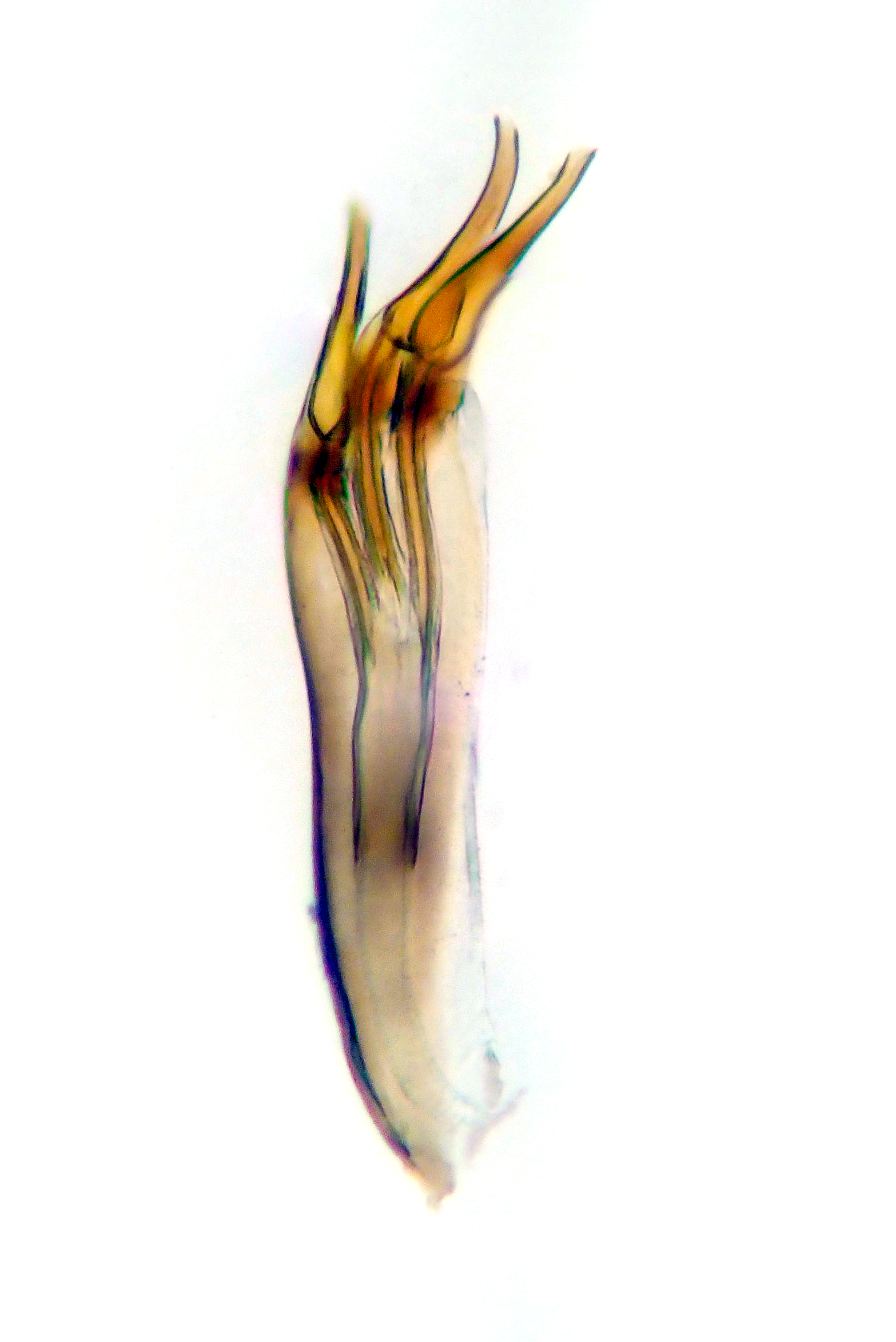
Cephalops ultimus male phallic ducts

Cephalops ultimus is a species of fly in the family Pipunculidae.

== Distribution ==
Austria, Belgium, Great Britain, Bulgaria, Czech Republic, Dodecanese , France, Germany, Hungary, Italy, Latvia, Norway, Poland, Slovakia, Spain, Switzerland, Netherlands.
