= Dasydorylas dactylos =

Scientific classification
- Kingdom: Animalia
- Phylum: Arthropoda
- Clade: Pancrustacea
- Class: Insecta
- Order: Diptera
- Family: Pipunculidae
- Subfamily: Pipunculinae
- Tribe: Eudorylini
- Genus: Dasydorylas
- Species: D. dactylos

Binomial name
- Dasydorylas dactylos Motamedinia & Skevington, 2020

Species of fly

Dasydorylas dactylos is a species of fly in the family Pipunculidae. It was described in 2020 by Behnam Motamedinia and Jeffrey H. Skevington from a male specimen collected in Israel.

== Description ==
The male holotype has a body length of about 3.3 mm, excluding the antennae. The species can be distinguished from related members of Dasydorylas by features including a long tapering flagellum, separated compound eyes in the male, and an apical finger-like process on the surstyli.

== Distribution ==
Dasydorylas dactylos is known from Israel.

== Etymology ==
The species name is derived from the Greek word dactylos, meaning "finger", referring to the shape of the surstyli.
