= Cephalops vittipes =

Scientific classification
- Kingdom: Animalia
- Phylum: Arthropoda
- Clade: Pancrustacea
- Class: Insecta
- Order: Diptera
- Family: Pipunculidae
- Subfamily: Pipunculinae
- Tribe: Cephalopsini
- Genus: Cephalops
- Species: C. vittipes

Binomial name
- Cephalops vittipes (Zetterstedt, 1844)

Synonyms
- Pipunculus vittipes Zetterstedt, 1844

Species of fly

Cephalops vittipes is a species of fly in the family Pipunculidae.

== Distribution ==
Europe.
