= Dasydorylas orientalis =

Scientific classification
- Kingdom: Animalia
- Phylum: Arthropoda
- Clade: Pancrustacea
- Class: Insecta
- Order: Diptera
- Family: Pipunculidae
- Subfamily: Pipunculinae
- Tribe: Eudorylini
- Genus: Dasydorylas
- Species: D. orientalis

Binomial name
- Dasydorylas orientalis (Koizumi, 1959)

Synonyms
- Dorilas orientalis Koizumi, 1959

Species of fly

Dasydorylas orientalis is a species of fly in the family Pipunculidae. It was first described by K. Koizumi in 1959 as Dorilas orientalis.

== Biology ==
The species was described in a study of pipunculid flies reared from the green rice leafhopper, Nephotettix cincticeps.

== Distribution ==
Dasydorylas orientalis is known from Japan.
