= Dasydorylas vulcanus =

Scientific classification
- Kingdom: Animalia
- Phylum: Arthropoda
- Clade: Pancrustacea
- Class: Insecta
- Order: Diptera
- Family: Pipunculidae
- Subfamily: Pipunculinae
- Tribe: Eudorylini
- Genus: Dasydorylas
- Species: D. vulcanus

Binomial name
- Dasydorylas vulcanus Rafael, 2004

Species of fly

Dasydorylas vulcanus is a species of fly in the family Pipunculidae. It was described by José Albertino Rafael in 2004 from a male specimen collected in Nicaragua.

== Distribution ==
Dasydorylas vulcanus is known from Nicaragua. The holotype was collected at Volcán Mombacho in the department of Granada.
