= Dasydorylas setosus =

Scientific classification
- Kingdom: Animalia
- Phylum: Arthropoda
- Clade: Pancrustacea
- Class: Insecta
- Order: Diptera
- Family: Pipunculidae
- Subfamily: Pipunculinae
- Tribe: Eudorylini
- Genus: Dasydorylas
- Species: D. setosus

Binomial name
- Dasydorylas setosus (Becker, 1908)

Synonyms
- Pipunculus setosus Becker, 1908

Species of fly

Dasydorylas setosus is a species of fly in the family Pipunculidae. It was first described by Theodor Becker in 1908 as Pipunculus setosus.

== Distribution ==
Dasydorylas setosus has been recorded from the Canary Islands, including Tenerife.
