= Claraeola melanostola =

Scientific classification
- Kingdom: Animalia
- Phylum: Arthropoda
- Clade: Pancrustacea
- Class: Insecta
- Order: Diptera
- Family: Pipunculidae
- Subfamily: Pipunculinae
- Tribe: Eudorylini
- Genus: Claraeola
- Species: C. melanostola

Binomial name
- Claraeola melanostola (Becker, 1898)

Synonyms
- Pipunculus melanostolus Becker, 1897

Species of fly

Claraeola melanostola is a species of fly in the family Pipunculidae.

== Distribution ==
Austria, Belgium, Great Britain, Czech Republic, Denmark, Germany, Italy, Latvia, Lithuania, Sweden, Netherlands.
