= Dasydorylas sericeus =

Scientific classification
- Kingdom: Animalia
- Phylum: Arthropoda
- Clade: Pancrustacea
- Class: Insecta
- Order: Diptera
- Family: Pipunculidae
- Subfamily: Pipunculinae
- Tribe: Eudorylini
- Genus: Dasydorylas
- Species: D. sericeus

Binomial name
- Dasydorylas sericeus (Becker, 1897)

Synonyms
- Pipunculus sericeus Becker, 1897; Eudorylas sericeus (Becker, 1897); Tomosvaryella demeyeri Kuznetzov, 1993

Species of fly

Dasydorylas sericeus is a species of fly in the family Pipunculidae. It was first described by Theodor Becker in 1897 as Pipunculus sericeus.

== Distribution ==
Dasydorylas sericeus is known from Europe.
