= Dasydorylas roseri =

Scientific classification
- Kingdom: Animalia
- Phylum: Arthropoda
- Clade: Pancrustacea
- Class: Insecta
- Order: Diptera
- Family: Pipunculidae
- Subfamily: Pipunculinae
- Tribe: Eudorylini
- Genus: Dasydorylas
- Species: D. roseri

Binomial name
- Dasydorylas roseri (Becker, 1897)

Synonyms
- Pipunculus roseri Becker, 1897; Eudorylas roseri (Becker, 1897)

Species of fly

Dasydorylas roseri is a species of fly in the family Pipunculidae. It was first described by Theodor Becker in 1897 as Pipunculus roseri. The species is known from Europe.
