= Cephalops varipes =

Scientific classification
- Kingdom: Animalia
- Phylum: Arthropoda
- Clade: Pancrustacea
- Class: Insecta
- Order: Diptera
- Family: Pipunculidae
- Subfamily: Pipunculinae
- Tribe: Cephalopsini
- Genus: Cephalops
- Species: C. varipes

Binomial name
- Cephalops varipes (Meigen, 1824)

Synonyms
- Pipunculus varipes Meigen, 1824; Pipunculus semifumosus Kowarz, 1887

Species of fly

Cephalops varipes is a species of fly in the family Pipunculidae.

== Distribution ==
Europe.
