= Cephalops carinatus =

Scientific classification
- Kingdom: Animalia
- Phylum: Arthropoda
- Clade: Pancrustacea
- Class: Insecta
- Order: Diptera
- Family: Pipunculidae
- Subfamily: Pipunculinae
- Tribe: Cephalopsini
- Genus: Cephalops
- Species: C. carinatus

Binomial name
- Cephalops carinatus (Verrall, 1901)

Synonyms
- Pipunculus carinatus Verrall, 1901

Species of fly

Cephalops carinatus is a species of fly in the family Pipunculidae.

== Distribution ==
Europe.
