= Dasydorylas parazardouei =

Scientific classification
- Kingdom: Animalia
- Phylum: Arthropoda
- Clade: Pancrustacea
- Class: Insecta
- Order: Diptera
- Family: Pipunculidae
- Subfamily: Pipunculinae
- Tribe: Eudorylini
- Genus: Dasydorylas
- Species: D. parazardouei

Binomial name
- Dasydorylas parazardouei Motamedinia & Skevington, 2020

Species of fly

Dasydorylas parazardouei is a species of fly in the family Pipunculidae. It was described in 2020 by Behnam Motamedinia and Jeffrey H. Skevington from specimens collected in the United Arab Emirates.

== Distribution ==
Dasydorylas parazardouei is known from the United Arab Emirates. The type series was collected at Wadi Wurayah.
