= Allomethus mysticus =

Scientific classification
- Kingdom: Animalia
- Phylum: Arthropoda
- Clade: Pancrustacea
- Class: Insecta
- Order: Diptera
- Family: Pipunculidae
- Subfamily: Pipunculinae
- Tribe: Eudorylini
- Genus: Allomethus
- Species: A. mysticus

Binomial name
- Allomethus mysticus Rapp, 1943

Species of insect

Allomethus mysticus is a species of fly in the family Pipunculidae. It was described by Rapp in 1943.

It is endemic to Quebec.
