= Cephalops pannonicus =

Scientific classification
- Kingdom: Animalia
- Phylum: Arthropoda
- Clade: Pancrustacea
- Class: Insecta
- Order: Diptera
- Family: Pipunculidae
- Subfamily: Pipunculinae
- Tribe: Cephalopsini
- Genus: Cephalops
- Species: C. pannonicus

Binomial name
- Cephalops pannonicus (Aczél, 1939)

Synonyms
- Beckerias pannonicus Aczél, 1939

Species of fly

Cephalops pannonicus is a species of fly in the family Pipunculidae.

== Distribution ==
Europe.
