= 1939 in paleontology =

List of years in paleontology	(table)
- … 1929; 1930; 1931; 1932; 1933; 1934; 1935; 1936; 1937; 1938; 1939; 1940; 1941; 1942; 1943; 1944; 1945; 1946; 1947; 1948; 1949 …
- In science 1936 1937 1938 1939 1940 1941 1942
- Art; Archaeology; Architecture; Literature; Music; Philosophy; Science; +...

Paleontology or palaeontology is the study of prehistoric life forms on Earth through the examination of plant and animal fossils. This includes the study of body fossils, tracks (ichnites), burrows, cast-off parts, fossilised feces (coprolites), palynomorphs and chemical residues. Because humans have encountered fossils for millennia, paleontology has a long history both before and after becoming formalized as a science. This article records significant discoveries and events related to paleontology that occurred or were published in the year 1939.

== Arthropods ==
=== Newly named Arachnids ===
Name	Novelty	Status	Authors	Age	Unit	Location	Notes	Images
Segestria succinei	Sp nov	Valid	Berland	Early Eocene	Baltic amber	Europe	A segestriid spider	Segestria succinei

=== Newly named insects ===
Name	Novelty	Status	Authors	Age	Unit	Location	Notes	Images
Ctenobethylus succinalis	Gen et sp nov	valid	Brues	Middle Eocene	Baltic amber	Europe	Fossil Dolichoderine ant, type species C. succinalis jr synonym of Ctenobethylus goepperti	Ctenobethylus goepperti
Protonephrocerus collini	Sp nov	jr synonym	Carpenter & Hull	Priabonian	Baltic Amber	Russia	A big-headed fly; moved to Metanephrocerus collini in 1948	
Protonephrocerus florissantius	Sp nov	jr synonym	Carpenter & Hull	Priabonian	Florissant Formation	USA (Colorado)	A big-headed fly; moved to Priabona florissantius	

== Dinosaurs ==
=== New taxa ===
Name	Novelty	Status	Authors	Age	Type locality	Location	Notes	Images
Bactrosaurus prynadai	Sp. nov.	Nomen dubium	Riabinin	Santonian	Dabrazinskaya Svita	Kazakhstan	A species of Bactrosaurus	
Jaxartosaurus aralensis	Gen. et sp. nov.	Valid	Riabinin	Santonian	Dabrazinskaya Svita	Kazakhstan	A hadrosaurid	
Omeisaurus junghsiensis	Gen. et sp. nov .	Valid	Yang	Bathonian-Callovian	Shaximiao Formation	China	A sauropod	

== Plesiosaurs ==
- Plesiosaur gastroliths documented.
