= Cephalops signatus =

Scientific classification
- Kingdom: Animalia
- Phylum: Arthropoda
- Clade: Pancrustacea
- Class: Insecta
- Order: Diptera
- Family: Pipunculidae
- Subfamily: Pipunculinae
- Tribe: Cephalopsini
- Genus: Cephalops
- Species: C. signatus

Binomial name
- Cephalops signatus (Becker, 1900)

Synonyms
- Pipunculus signatus Becker, 1900

Species of fly

Cephalops signatus is a species of fly in the family Pipunculidae.

== Distribution ==
Austria, Belgium, Great Britain, Czech Republic, France, Germany, Hungary, Italy, Latvia, Slovakia, Netherlands, Yugoslavia.
