= Cephalops perspicuus =

Scientific classification
- Kingdom: Animalia
- Phylum: Arthropoda
- Clade: Pancrustacea
- Class: Insecta
- Order: Diptera
- Family: Pipunculidae
- Subfamily: Pipunculinae
- Tribe: Cephalopsini
- Genus: Cephalops
- Species: C. perspicuus

Binomial name
- Cephalops perspicuus (Meijere, 1907)

Synonyms
- Pipunculus perspicuus Meijere, 1907; Pipunculus flavomaculatus Strobl, 1910; Pipunculus subflavus Becker, 1921

Species of fly

Cephalops perspicuus is a species of fly in the family Pipunculidae.

== Distribution ==
Great Britain, Netherlands.
