= Allomethus catharinensis =

Scientific classification
- Kingdom: Animalia
- Phylum: Arthropoda
- Clade: Pancrustacea
- Class: Insecta
- Order: Diptera
- Family: Pipunculidae
- Subfamily: Pipunculinae
- Tribe: Eudorylini
- Genus: Allomethus
- Species: A. catharinensis

Binomial name
- Allomethus catharinensis Rafael, 1991

Species of fly

Allomethus catharinensis is a species of fly in the family Pipunculidae. It was described by Rafael in 1991.

== Distribution ==
Brazil.
