= Dasydorylas forcipus =

Scientific classification
- Kingdom: Animalia
- Phylum: Arthropoda
- Clade: Pancrustacea
- Class: Insecta
- Order: Diptera
- Family: Pipunculidae
- Subfamily: Pipunculinae
- Tribe: Eudorylini
- Genus: Dasydorylas
- Species: D. forcipus

Binomial name
- Dasydorylas forcipus Motamedinia & Skevington, 2020

Species of fly

Dasydorylas forcipus is a species of fly in the family Pipunculidae. It was described in 2020 by Behnam Motamedinia and Jeffrey H. Skevington from a male specimen collected in Israel.

== Distribution ==
Dasydorylas forcipus is known from Israel. The holotype was collected in the Nahal Qana Reserve.

== Etymology ==
The species name is derived from the Latin word forceps, meaning "tongs", referring to the shape of the male surstyli.
