= Claraeola halterata =

Scientific classification
- Kingdom: Animalia
- Phylum: Arthropoda
- Clade: Pancrustacea
- Class: Insecta
- Order: Diptera
- Family: Pipunculidae
- Subfamily: Pipunculinae
- Tribe: Eudorylini
- Genus: Claraeola
- Species: C. halterata

Binomial name
- Claraeola halterata (Meigen, 1838)

Synonyms
- Pipunculus halteratus Meigen, 1838

Species of fly

Claraeola halterata is a species of fly in the family Pipunculidae.

== Distribution ==
Austria, Belgium, Great Britain, Germany, Latvia, Netherlands.
