= Dasydorylas cinctus =

Scientific classification
- Kingdom: Animalia
- Phylum: Arthropoda
- Clade: Pancrustacea
- Class: Insecta
- Order: Diptera
- Family: Pipunculidae
- Subfamily: Pipunculinae
- Tribe: Eudorylini
- Genus: Dasydorylas
- Species: D. cinctus

Binomial name
- Dasydorylas cinctus (Banks, 1915)

Synonyms
- Pipunculus cinctus Banks, 1915

Species of fly

Dasydorylas cinctus is a species of fly in the family Pipunculidae. It was first described by Nathan Banks in 1915 as Pipunculus cinctus.

== Distribution ==
Dasydorylas cinctus has been recorded from the United States, Mexico, Costa Rica and Nicaragua.
