= Nephrocerus flavicornis =

Scientific classification
- Kingdom: Animalia
- Phylum: Arthropoda
- Clade: Pancrustacea
- Class: Insecta
- Order: Diptera
- Family: Pipunculidae
- Subfamily: Nephrocerinae
- Tribe: Nephrocerini
- Genus: Nephrocerus
- Species: N. flavicornis

Binomial name
- Nephrocerus flavicornis Zetterstedt, 1844

Synonyms
- Pipunculus flavicornis Zetterstedt, 1844

Species of fly

Nephrocerus flavicornis is a species of fly in the family Pipunculidae.

== Distribution ==
It is found in Europe.
