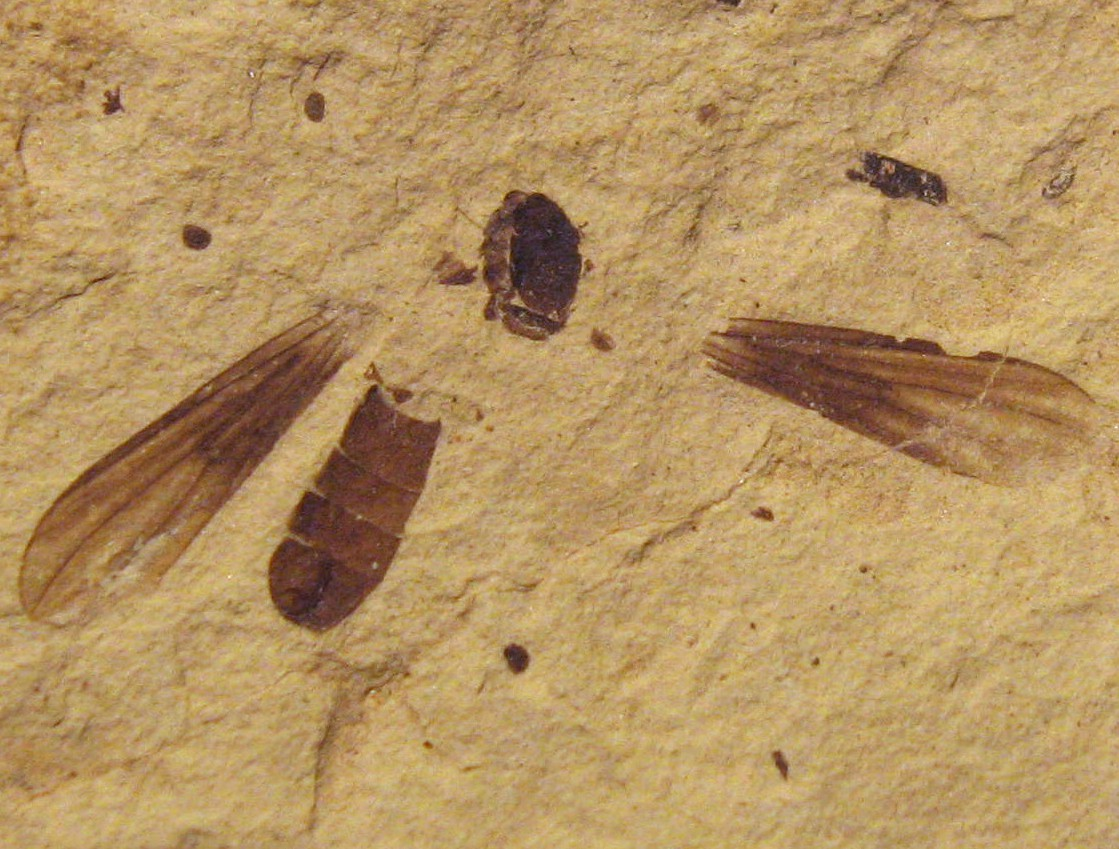
- Metanephrocerus belgardeae holotype

Scientific classification
- Kingdom: Animalia
- Phylum: Arthropoda
- Class: Insecta
- Order: Diptera
- Family: Pipunculidae
- Subfamily: Protonephrocerinae
- Genus: †Metanephrocerus; Aczél, 1948

Species
- M. belgardeae; M. collini; M. groehni; M. hoffeinsorum

= Metanephrocerus =

Metanephrocerus Temporal range: Ypresian–Priabonian

Extinct genus of flies

Metanephrocerus is an extinct genus of big-headed flies in the dipteran subfamily Protonephrocerinae, for which it is one of only two genera. The genus contains four described species, Metanephrocerus belgardeae, M. collini, M. groehni, and M. hoffeinsorum. Metanephrocerus is known from a group of Middle Eocene fossils which were found in Europe and a single early Eocene fossil from North America.

== History and classification ==
When first described, Metanephrocerus was known only from two separate fossils, the holotype female, and the female paratype were fossilized as inclusions in transparent chunks of Baltic amber. Baltic amber is approximately forty-six million years old, having been deposited during the Lutetian stage of the Middle Eocene. There is debate on what plant family produced the amber, with evidence supporting relatives of either an Agathis or a Pseudolarix relative.

Fossils of the type species, M. collini, were first studied by American entomologist Frank M. Carpenter and F. M. Hull who placed the new species in the genus Protonephrocerus. Carpenter and Hull's 1939 type description of the new species was published in the monograph series Bernstein-Forschungens. The species was moved to the new genus Metanephrocerus in a 1948 paper by Martin L Aczél, and since that time both the type specimens have been lost and are considered possibly destroyed. After the M. collini description, 75 years passed before an additional three related species were described. Two of those, M. groehni and M. hoffeinsorum. were described from solitary fossil inclusions in Baltic amber. The 2014 descriptions were made by Christian Kehlmaier, Manuel Dierick and Jeffrey H. Skevington, based on detailed CT scans of the specimens. They chose the species name "groehni" is a patronym honoring Carsten Gröhn, who supported the research of the authors, and who was the owner of the specimen before description. The fossil was to be deposited into the collections of the Geologisch-Paläontologisches Institut und Museum der Universität Hamburg. Similarly, the epithet of the second species "hoffeinsorum" is a patronym for Christel and Hans-Werner Hoffeins for the donation of the type fossil to the Senckenberg Deutsches Entomologisches Institut and for their support of the authors research. The third related species, M. belgardeae, bringing the total to four, was described from a compression fossil found in the early Eocene, Ypresian Klondike Mountain Formation lagerstätten, its discovery expanding both the temporal range and geographic range. M. belgardeae was described by S. Bruce Archibald, Christian Kehlmaier, and Rolf Mathewes from a single partial female. The specific epithet is a matronym of Azure Rain Belgarde, who collected the type specimen, SR 08-06-02, and donated it to the Stonerose Interpretive Center.

Placement of the group has changed several times, with Metanephrocerus and Protonephrocerus being placed in the pipunculid subfamily Nephrocerinae as tribe Protonephrocerini from 1948 until 2014. The placement of the tribe was challenged in 2014 by Kehlmaier, Dierick and Skevington who suggested inclusion of the genera made Nephrocerinae paraphyletic. As such they elevated the tribe Protonephrocerini to the subfamily rank as Protonephrocerinae, leaving only Nephrocerus and Priabona in Nephrocerinae.

== Description ==
Metanephrocerus belgardeae is a large species, with a wing length of 9.2 millimetres (0.36 in), and a hyaline wing coloration, broken by a smokey tone to the pterostigma and basal area of the wing. The wing has a long third section of the costal vein and the median vein that is long and straight. The female's abdomen is approximately 4.4 millimetres (0.17 in) long, with short setae on the tergites, which grade to longer tergites on the first and second tergites. The short abdominal setae are distinct for the genus and exclude the species from other pipnculid genera.

M. collini was known from 2 female specimens, which had hyaline wings with colored pterostigma.

M. groehni is a nearly complete male fly with a total body length of 5.7 millimetres (0.22 in), and is only missing the tip of the left hind leg. The hind legs show a distinct chaetotaxy to the setae, with front sides having setae that are longer than the femur is wide. The eyes connect for three times the length of the frons. The wings are 6.0 millimetres (0.24 in), though the wings are folded slightly and difficult to fully assess. The halters are darkened at the base and on the knob.

M. hoffeinsorum is a whole male, though large portions of it are enclosed in white mold and the specimen has a total length of 6.6 millimetres (0.26 in). The wings show a length of 6.7 millimetres (0.26 in) and have a covering of microtrichia. As with M. groehni the halters have darkened knobs and bases and the pteropleuron has 6 hairs on it. Tergite three of the abdomen is 1.3 times as long as tergite two.
