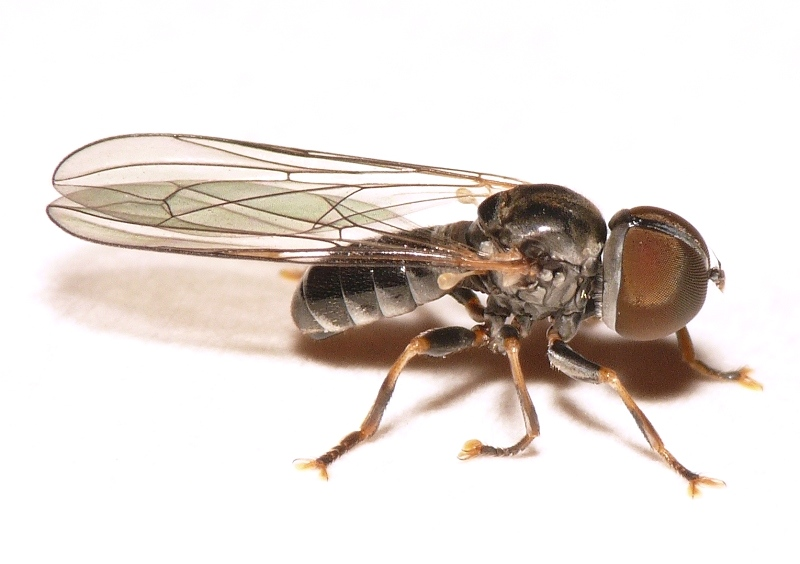

Scientific classification
- Kingdom: Animalia
- Phylum: Arthropoda
- Clade: Pancrustacea
- Class: Insecta
- Order: Diptera
- Family: Pipunculidae
- Subfamily: Pipunculinae
- Tribe: Eudorylini
- Genus: Clistoabdominalis
- Species: C. ruralis

Binomial name
- Clistoabdominalis ruralis (Meigen, 1824)

Synonyms
- Pipunculus ruralis Meigen, 1824; Pipunculus arimosus Becker, 1900; Dorilas dudai Hardy, 1947; Eudorylas fischeri Dunk, 1995

= Clistoabdominalis ruralis =

Species of fly

Clistoabdominalis ruralis is a species of fly in the family Pipunculidae.

== Distribution ==
Europe.
