= Dioxyna brachybasis =

Scientific classification
- Kingdom: Animalia
- Phylum: Arthropoda
- Class: Insecta
- Order: Diptera
- Family: Tephritidae
- Subfamily: Tephritinae
- Tribe: Tephritini
- Genus: Dioxyna
- Species: D. brachybasis

Binomial name
- Dioxyna brachybasis Hardy, 1988

Species of fly

Dioxyna brachybasis is a species of tephritid or fruit flies in the genus Dioxyna of the family Tephritidae.

== Distribution ==
New Guinea, Australia, Fiji, Austral, Niue and Cook Islands.
