= Elmohardyia =

Scientific classification
- Kingdom: Animalia
- Phylum: Arthropoda
- Clade: Pancrustacea
- Class: Insecta
- Order: Diptera
- Family: Pipunculidae
- Subfamily: Pipunculinae
- Tribe: Eudorylini
- Genus: Elmohardyia; Rafael, 1987

Type species
- Pipunculus doelloi Shannon, 1927

Genus of flies

Elmohardyia is a genus of flies in the family Pipunculidae.

== Species ==
- Elmohardyia adunca Rafael & Menezes, 1999
- Elmohardyia amazona (Hardy, 1950)
- Elmohardyia angustifrons (Becker, 1900)
- Elmohardyia aquinoi Menezes & Rafael, 1997
- Elmohardyia argentata (Hardy, 1954)
- Elmohardyia argentocincta Rafael, 1988
- Elmohardyia argyrogaster Rafael, 1988
- Elmohardyia arnaudi Rafael, 1988
- Elmohardyia arx Rafael, 1988
- Elmohardyia atlantica (Hough, 1899)
- Elmohardyia bifida Rafael & Menezes, 1999
- Elmohardyia carrerai (Hardy, 1950)
- Elmohardyia cearensis Marques & Rafael, 2015
- Elmohardyia cheliformis Marques & Rafael, 2015
- Elmohardyia circulus Rafael, 1988
- Elmohardyia concava Menezes & Rafael, 1997
- Elmohardyia conchulata Menezes & Rafael, 1996
- Elmohardyia congruens (Hardy, 1950)
- Elmohardyia costaricana Rafael & Menezes, 1999
- Elmohardyia denigrata Rafael, 1988
- Elmohardyia distincta Marques & Rafael, 2015
- Elmohardyia doelloi (Shannon, 1927)
- Elmohardyia echinata Menezes & Rafael, 1997
- Elmohardyia eminula (Hardy, 1965)
- Elmohardyia exserta (Hardy, 1965)
- Elmohardyia formosa Marques & Rafael, 2015
- Elmohardyia galeata Rafael & Menezes, 1999
- Elmohardyia gowdeyi (Curran, 1928)
- Elmohardyia guimaraesi Rafael, 1988
- Elmohardyia hispida Menezes & Rafael, 1997
- Elmohardyia immaculata Menezes & Rafael, 1997
- Elmohardyia inepta (Hardy, 1954)
- Elmohardyia lanei (Hardy, 1965)
- Elmohardyia limeirai Marques & Rafael, 2015
- Elmohardyia lindneri (Collin, 1931)
- Elmohardyia maculata Rafael & Menezes, 1999
- Elmohardyia manaos Menezes & Rafael, 1996
- Elmohardyia martae Marques & Rafael, 2015
- Elmohardyia merga Rafael, 1988
- Elmohardyia nicaraguensis Rafael, 2004
- Elmohardyia oriximinaensis Menezes & Rafael, 1997
- Elmohardyia papaveroi Rafael, 1988
- Elmohardyia parva Menezes & Rafael, 1997
- Elmohardyia potiguar Marques & Rafael, 2015
- Elmohardyia praecipua Rafael & Rosa, 1992
- Elmohardyia quadricornis Marques & Rafael, 2015
- Elmohardyia replicata (Hardy, 1948)
- Elmohardyia reversa Rafael, 1988
- Elmohardyia roraimensis Rafael & Rosa, 1992
- Elmohardyia rosalinae Marques & Rafael, 2015
- Elmohardyia rosalyae Menezes & Rafael, 1997
- Elmohardyia scoliostylis (Hardy, 1965)
- Elmohardyia spatulata Rafael, 1988
- Elmohardyia spuria Rafael, 1988
- Elmohardyia subnitella (Hardy, 1965)
- Elmohardyia subtilis Menezes & Rafael, 1997
- Elmohardyia tingomariae Rafael, 1988
- Elmohardyia tricuspis Menezes & Rafael, 1997
- Elmohardyia trinidadensis (Hardy, 1948)
- Elmohardyia tuberosa Rafael, 1988
- Elmohardyia valida Menezes & Rafael, 1997
