= Microcephalops =

Scientific classification
- Kingdom: Animalia
- Phylum: Arthropoda
- Class: Insecta
- Order: Diptera
- Family: Pipunculidae
- Subfamily: Pipunculinae
- Tribe: Microcephalopsini
- Genus: Microcephalops; De Meyer, 1989

Type species
- Pipunculus banksi Aczél, 1940

Genus of insects

Microcephalops is a genus of flies belonging to the family Pipunculidae.

== Species ==
- Microcephalops adunatus (Hardy, 1972)
- Microcephalops angustifacies (Hardy, 1949)
- Microcephalops anthracias (Perkins, 1905)
- Microcephalops banksi (Aczél, 1940)
- Microcephalops borneensis (Hardy, 1972)
- Microcephalops brevicornis (Loew, 1858)
- Microcephalops conspectus (Hardy, 1949)
- Microcephalops damasi (Hardy, 1950)
- Microcephalops dolosus (Hardy, 1972)
- Microcephalops exsertus (Hardy, 1966)
- Microcephalops fimbriatus (Hardy, 1972)
- Microcephalops floridae De Meyer, 1990
- Microcephalops griseus De Meyer, 1990
- Microcephalops homoeophanes (Perkins, 1905)
- Microcephalops inermus (Hardy, 1954)
- Microcephalops kurseongiensis (Kapoor, Grewal & Sharma, 1987)
- Microcephalops latifrons (Hardy, 1948)
- Microcephalops microdes (Perkins, 1905)
- Microcephalops minisculus De Meyer, 1996
- Microcephalops montanus De Meyer, 1996
- Microcephalops mutuus (Hardy, 1968)
- Microcephalops opacus (Fallén, 1816)
- Microcephalops parafloridae De Meyer, 1990
- Microcephalops ravilateralis (Hardy, 1965)
- Microcephalops rufopictus (Hardy, 1962)
- Microcephalops spenceri (Hardy, 1972)
- Microcephalops stenopsis (Hardy, 1960)
- Microcephalops subaeneus (Brunetti, 1923)
- Microcephalops subdolosus (Kapoor, Grewal & Sharma, 1987)
- Microcephalops transversalis (Rafael, 1991)
- Microcephalops williamsi (Hardy, 1954)
