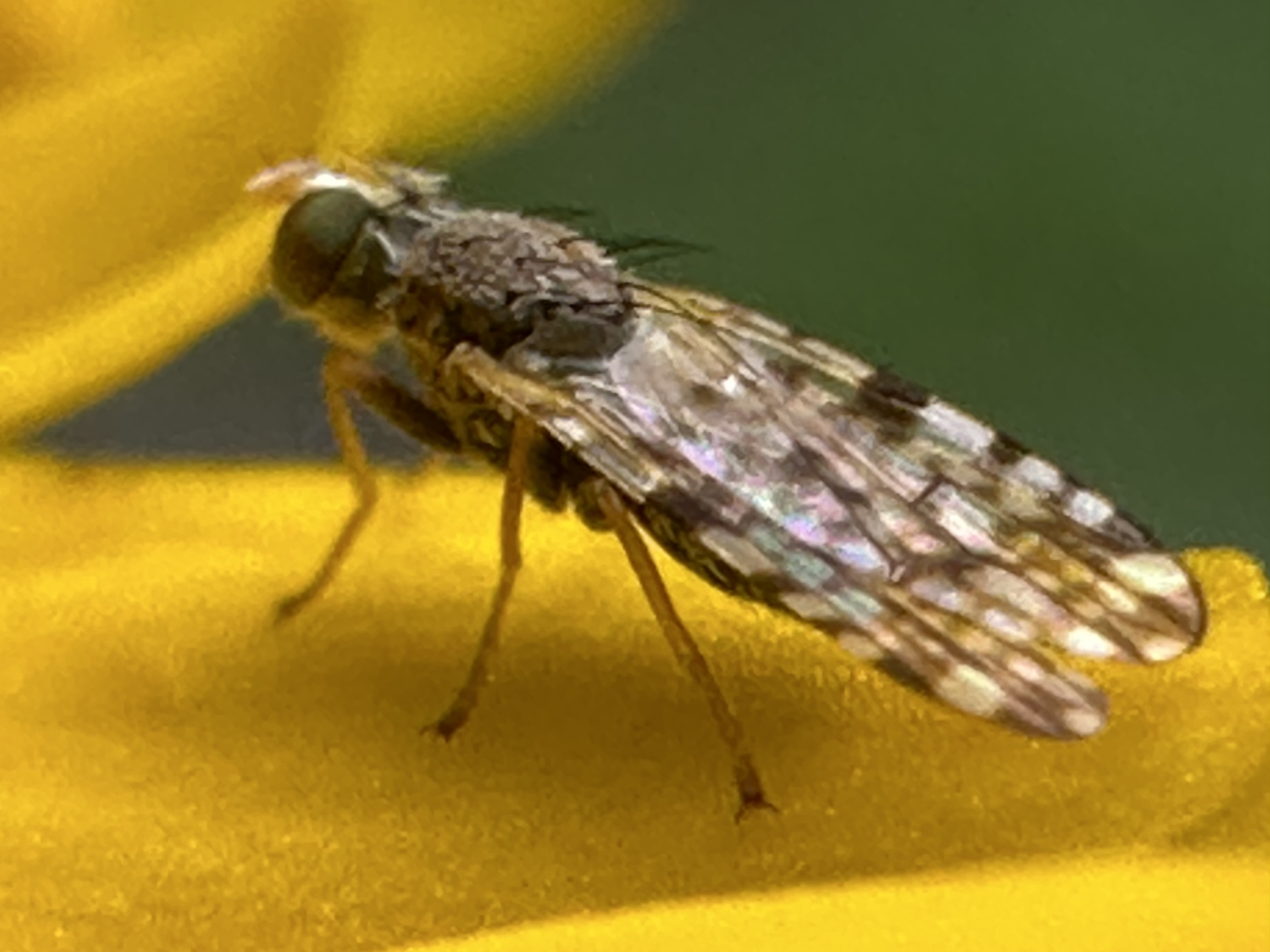

Scientific classification
- Kingdom: Animalia
- Phylum: Arthropoda
- Class: Insecta
- Order: Diptera
- Family: Tephritidae
- Subfamily: Tephritinae
- Tribe: Tephritini
- Genus: Dioxyna
- Species: D. picciola

Binomial name
- Dioxyna picciola (Bigot, 1857)

Synonyms
- Acinia picciola Bigot, 1857; Trypeta aurifera Thomson, 1869; Trypeta humilis Loew, 1862; Dioxyna piccicola Dirlbek & Dirlbekova, 1973; Dioxyna piccola Hardy, 1988; Dioxyna plicicollis Hardy & Foote, 1989; Tephritis pucciola Washburn, 1905

= Dioxyna picciola =

Species of fly

Dioxyna picciola is a species of tephritid or fruit flies in the genus Dioxyna of the family Tephritidae. It feeds on a wide variety of Asteraceae.

== Distribution ==
Canada, United States Costa Rica, Bermuda, West Indies.
