= Dioxyna conflicta =

Scientific classification
- Kingdom: Animalia
- Phylum: Arthropoda
- Class: Insecta
- Order: Diptera
- Family: Tephritidae
- Subfamily: Tephritinae
- Tribe: Tephritini
- Genus: Dioxyna
- Species: D. conflicta

Binomial name
- Dioxyna conflicta (Curran, 1929)

Synonyms
- Paroxyna conflicta ssp. funalisCurran, 1929; Dioxyna heringi Hardy, 1974; Ensina conflicta Curran, 1929; Paroxyna gemina Hering, 1941

Species of fly

Dioxyna conflicta is a species of tephritid or fruit flies in the genus Dioxyna of the family Tephritidae.

== Distribution ==
Philippines, Indonesia, New Guinea, New Britain, New Caledonia.
