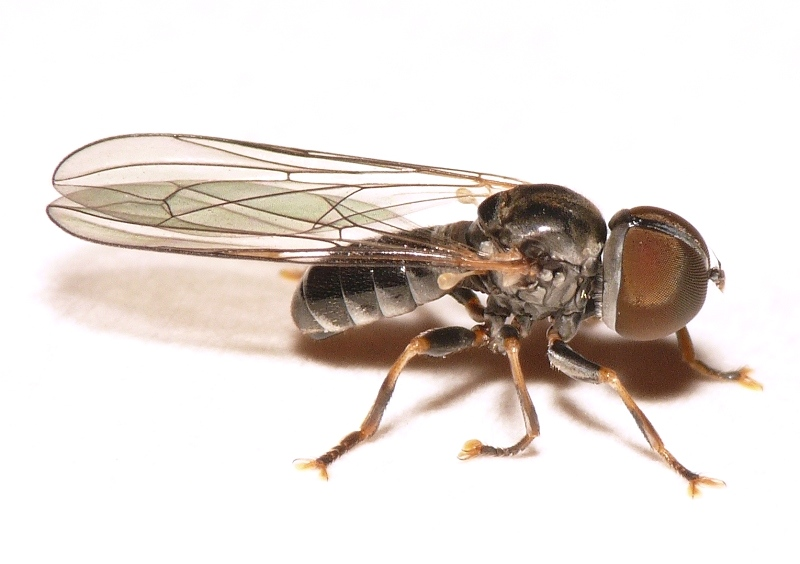
- Clistoabdominalis ruralis

Scientific classification
- Kingdom: Animalia
- Phylum: Arthropoda
- Clade: Pancrustacea
- Class: Insecta
- Order: Diptera
- Family: Pipunculidae
- Subfamily: Pipunculinae
- Tribe: Eudorylini
- Genus: Clistoabdominalis; Skevington, 2001

Type species
- Pipunculus helluo Perkins, 1905

= Clistoabdominalis =

Genus of flies

Clistoabdominalis is a genus of flies in the family Pipunculidae.

== Species ==
- Clistoabdominalis ancylus Skevington, 2001
- Clistoabdominalis angelikae Skevington, 2001
- Clistoabdominalis arabicus Motamedina & Skevington, 2020
- Clistoabdominalis ascitus (De Meyer, 1995)
- Clistoabdominalis beneficiens (Perkins, 1905)
- Clistoabdominalis capillifascis Skevington, 2001
- Clistoabdominalis carnatistylus Skevington, 2001
- Clistoabdominalis collessi Skevington, 2001
- Clistoabdominalis colophus Skevington, 2001
- Clistoabdominalis condylostylus Skevington, 2001
- Clistoabdominalis danielsi Skevington, 2001
- Clistoabdominalis dasymelus Skevington, 2001
- Clistoabdominalis digitatus Skevington, 2001
- Clistoabdominalis dilatatus (De Meyer, 1997)
- Clistoabdominalis doczkali Kehlmaier, 2005
- Clistoabdominalis eutrichodes (Perkins, 1906)
- Clistoabdominalis exallus Skevington, 2001
- Clistoabdominalis gaban Skevington, 2001
- Clistoabdominalis gremialis Skevington, 2001
- Clistoabdominalis helluo (Perkins, 1905)
- Clistoabdominalis imitator (De Meyer, 1995)
- Clistoabdominalis koebelei (Perkins, 1905)
- Clistoabdominalis lambkinae Skevington, 2001
- Clistoabdominalis lingulatus Skevington, 2001
- Clistoabdominalis lomholdti Földvári, 2003
- Clistoabdominalis macropygus (Meijere, 1914)
- Clistoabdominalis mathiesoni Skevington, 2001
- Clistoabdominalis mitarakensis Marques & Pollet, 2019
- Clistoabdominalis monas (Perkins, 1905)
- Clistoabdominalis nanus Motamedina & Skevington, 2020
- Clistoabdominalis nitidifrons (Becker, 1900)
- Clistoabdominalis nutatus Skevington, 2001
- Clistoabdominalis octiparvus Skevington, 2001
- Clistoabdominalis persicus Motamedina & Skevington, 2020
- Clistoabdominalis platyphalligus Motamedina & Skevington, 2020
- Clistoabdominalis reipublicae (Walker, 1849)
- Clistoabdominalis roralis (Kertész, 1915)
- Clistoabdominalis ruralis (Meigen, 1824)
- Clistoabdominalis scalenus Skevington, 2001
- Clistoabdominalis scintillatus Skevington, 2001
- Clistoabdominalis sinaiensis (De Meyer, 1995)
- Clistoabdominalis spinitibialis (Hardy, 1954)
- Clistoabdominalis subruralis (Kozánek & Kwon, 1991)
- Clistoabdominalis tasmanicus Skevington, 2001
- Clistoabdominalis tharra Skevington, 2001
- Clistoabdominalis tribulosus Motamedina & Skevington, 2020
- Clistoabdominalis trochanteratus (Becker, 1900)
- Clistoabdominalis tumidus (De Meyer, 1997)
- Clistoabdominalis uniformis (Brunetti, 1917)
- Clistoabdominalis uzbekistanus (Kozánek, 1988)
- Clistoabdominalis yeatesi Skevington, 2001
