= Claraeola =

Scientific classification
- Kingdom: Animalia
- Phylum: Arthropoda
- Clade: Pancrustacea
- Class: Insecta
- Order: Diptera
- Family: Pipunculidae
- Subfamily: Pipunculinae
- Tribe: Eudorylini
- Genus: Claraeola; Aczél, 1940

Type species
- Dorylas adventitius Kertész, 1912

Genus of flies

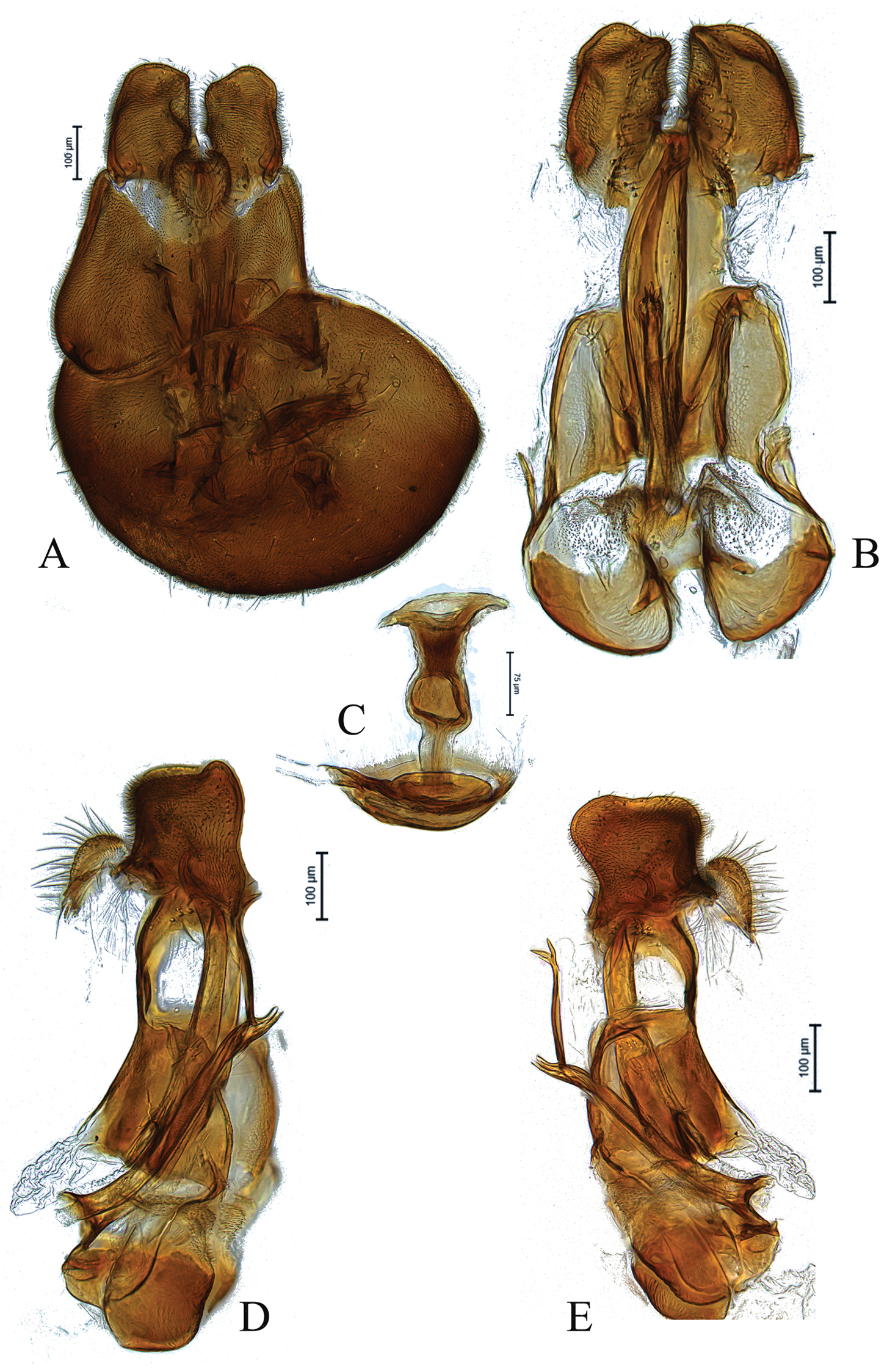

Claraeola is a genus of flies in the family Pipunculidae.

== Species ==
- Claraeola adventitia (Kertész, 1912)
- Claraeola agnosta Kehlmaier, 2005
- Claraeola alata (Kozánek, 1991)
- Claraeola amica (Kozánek, 1991)
- Claraeola anorhaeba (Hardy, 1968)
- Claraeola bousynterga Motamedina & Skevington, 2019
- Claraeola celata (Hardy, 1972)
- Claraeola clavata (Becker, 1897)
- Claraeola colossa (Hardy, 1972)
- Claraeola conjuncta (Collin, 1949)
- Claraeola crassula Shatalkin, 1981
- Claraeola cyclohirta Skevington, 2002
- Claraeola cypriota Kehlmaier, 2005
- Claraeola discors (Hardy, 1966)
- Claraeola erinys (Perkins, 1905)
- Claraeola francoisi (Hardy, 1952)
- Claraeola freyi (Hardy, 1972)
- Claraeola gigantea (Hardy, 1972)
- Claraeola gigas (Kertész, 1912)
- Claraeola halterata (Meigen, 1838)
- Claraeola heidiae Motamedina & Skevington, 2019
- Claraeola khorshidae Motamedinia & Kehlmaier, 2017
- Claraeola khuzestanensis Motamedina & Skevington, 2019
- Claraeola koreana (Kozánek & Kwon, 1991)
- Claraeola mantisphalliga Motamedina & Skevington, 2019
- Claraeola melanostola (Becker, 1897)
- Claraeola nigripennis (Hardy, 1949)
- Claraeola oppleta (Collin, 1941)
- Claraeola palgongsana (Kozánek, Suh & Kwon, 2003)
- Claraeola parnianae Motamedinia & Kehlmaier, 2017
- Claraeola perpaucisquamosa Kehlmaier, 2005
- Claraeola robusta (Kozánek, Suh & Kwon, 2003)
- Claraeola sicilis Skevington, 2002
- Claraeola spargosis Skevington, 2002
- Claraeola spinosa (Kozánek, 1991)
- Claraeola suranganiensis (Kapoor & Grewal, 1985)
- Claraeola thekkadiensis (Kapoor, Grewal & Sharma, 1987)
- Claraeola totonigra (Hardy, 1968)
- Claraeola yingka Skevington, 2002
