= Dasydorylas =

Scientific classification
- Kingdom: Animalia
- Phylum: Arthropoda
- Clade: Pancrustacea
- Class: Insecta
- Order: Diptera
- Family: Pipunculidae
- Subfamily: Pipunculinae
- Tribe: Eudorylini
- Genus: Dasydorylas; Skevington, 2001

Type species
- Pipunculus eucalypti Perkins, 1905

Genus of flies

Dasydorylas is a genus of flies in the family Pipunculidae.

== Species ==
- Dasydorylas cinctus (Banks, 1915)
- Dasydorylas dactylos Motamedinia & Skevington, 2020
- Dasydorylas discoidalis (Becker, 1897)
- Dasydorylas dolichostigmus (Perkins, 1905)
- Dasydorylas dorsalis (Hardy, 1950)
- Dasydorylas eucalypti (Perkins, 1905)
- Dasydorylas fallax (Perkins, 1905)
- Dasydorylas filiformis Kehlmaier, 2005
- Dasydorylas forcipus Motamedinia & Skevington, 2020
- Dasydorylas gradus Kehlmaier, 2005
- Dasydorylas horridus (Becker, 1897)
- Dasydorylas infissus (Hardy, 1968)
- Dasydorylas lamellifer (Perkins, 1905)
- Dasydorylas monothrix (Hardy, 1968)
- Dasydorylas nigripedes (Hardy, 1954)
- Dasydorylas orientalis (Koizumi, 1959)
- Dasydorylas parazardouei Motamedinia & Skevington, 2020
- Dasydorylas quasidorsalis (Hardy, 1961)
- Dasydorylas roseri (Becker, 1897)
- Dasydorylas sericeus (Becker, 1897)
- Dasydorylas setosilobus (Hardy, 1972)
- Dasydorylas setosus (Becker, 1908)
- Dasydorylas sordidatus (Hardy, 1950)
- Dasydorylas vulcanus Rafael, 2004
- Dasydorylas zardouei Motamedinia & Kehlmaier, 2017
