= Cephalops =

Scientific classification
- Kingdom: Animalia
- Phylum: Arthropoda
- Clade: Pancrustacea
- Class: Insecta
- Order: Diptera
- Family: Pipunculidae
- Subfamily: Pipunculinae
- Tribe: Cephalopsini
- Genus: Cephalops; Fallén, 1810

Type species
- Cephalops aeneus Fallén, 1810

Synonyms
- Wittella Hardy, 1950; Demeyerias Kuznetzov, 1995

Genus of insects

Cephalops is a genus of flies belonging to the family Pipunculidae.

The genus has cosmopolitan distribution, meaning it's found almost everywhere in the world where there is a suitable habitat.

== Species ==
- Cephalops abditus (Hardy, 1949)
- Cephalops acklandi Kozánek & De Meyer, 1992
- Cephalops acrothrix (Perkins, 1910)
- Cephalops adamanteus De Meyer & Kozánek, 1990
- Cephalops aeneus Fallén, 1810
- Cephalops albivillosus (Hardy, 1949)
- Cephalops alienus (Hardy, 1953)
- Cephalops amapaensis Rafael, 1991
- Cephalops amembranosus Rafael, 1991
- Cephalops amplus (Hardy, 1964)
- Cephalops apletomeris (Hardy, 1964)
- Cephalops argenteus Kuznetzov, 1991
- Cephalops argutus (Hardy, 1968)
- Cephalops ariadneae De Meyer, 1992
- Cephalops artifrons (Hardy, 1968)
- Cephalops bellulus (Hardy, 1949)
- Cephalops bequaerti (Curran, 1929)
- Cephalops bicuspidis (Hardy, 1964)
- Cephalops bifidus De Meyer & Grootaert, 1990
- Cephalops boharti (Hardy, 1949)
- Cephalops brasiliensis (Hardy, 1950)
- Cephalops buclavus (Hardy, 1968)
- Cephalops burmensis De Meyer, 1992
- Cephalops caeruleimontanus De Meyer, 1992
- Cephalops calcaratus (Hardy, 1949)
- Cephalops callistus (Hardy, 1954)
- Cephalops calvus (De Meyer, 1990)
- Cephalops candidulus (Hardy, 1949)
- Cephalops canutifrons (Hardy, 1964)
- Cephalops carinatus (Verrall, 1901)
- Cephalops cautus (Hardy, 1952)
- Cephalops chandiensis (Kapoor, Grewal & Sharma, 1987)
- Cephalops chauliosternum (Hardy, 1964)
- Cephalops cochleatus De Meyer, 1992
- Cephalops congoensis (Hardy, 1949)
- Cephalops conjunctivus Collin, 1958
- Cephalops cornutus (Hardy, 1953)
- Cephalops crassispinus Yang & Xu, 1998
- Cephalops curtifrons Coe, 1966
- Cephalops curvarmatus De Meyer, 1990
- Cephalops delomeris (Hardy, 1964)
- Cephalops deminitens (Hardy, 1966)
- Cephalops digitatus De Meyer, 1990
- Cephalops emeljanovi Kuznetzov, 1990
- Cephalops eufraternus (Kapoor, Grewal & Sharma, 1987)
- Cephalops euryhymenos (Hardy, 1964)
- Cephalops excellens (Kertész, 1912)
- Cephalops eximius (Hardy, 1972)
- Cephalops extimus (Hardy, 1952)
- Cephalops filicicola (Hardy, 1964)
- Cephalops flaviventris De Meyer, 1992
- Cephalops flavocinctus (Brunetti, 1912)
- Cephalops fraternus (Kertész, 1912)
- Cephalops furnaceus De Meyer, 1990
- Cephalops gansuensis Yang & Xu, 1998
- Cephalops gnomus (Hardy, 1964)
- Cephalops gracilentus Yang & Xu, 1998
- Cephalops grandimembranus De Meyer, 1989
- Cephalops grootaerti De Meyer, 1990
- Cephalops haleakalaae (Hardy, 1953)
- Cephalops hardyi De Meyer, 1990
- Cephalops hawaiiensis (Perkins, 1905)
- Cephalops hemistilbus (Hardy, 1961)
- Cephalops hirtifemurus Yang & Xu, 1998
- Cephalops holomelas (Perkins, 1910)
- Cephalops huashanensis (Yang & Xu, 1989)
- Cephalops imperfectus Becker, 1921
- Cephalops inchoatus (Hardy, 1949)
- Cephalops incohatus Morakote, 1990
- Cephalops inflatus De Meyer, 1992
- Cephalops injectivus (Hardy, 1964)
- Cephalops innitidus Rafael, 1991
- Cephalops inpaganus Rafael, 1991
- Cephalops javensis De Meyer, 1992
- Cephalops juvator (Perkins, 1905)
- Cephalops juvencus (Hardy, 1964)
- Cephalops kalimus (Hardy, 1962)
- Cephalops kashmerensis (Kapoor, Grewal & Sharma, 1987)
- Cephalops koolauensis (Hardy, 1964)
- Cephalops kumaonensis (Kapoor, Grewal & Sharma, 1987)
- Cephalops kumatai Morakote, 1990
- Cephalops kunashiricus Kuznetzov, 1990
- Cephalops kurilensis Kuznetzov, 1990
- Cephalops laeviventris (Loew, 1858)
- Cephalops laterisutilis (Hardy, 1964)
- Cephalops libidinosus De Meyer, 1991
- Cephalops limatus (Hardy, 1965)
- Cephalops longicaudus Yang & Xu, 1998
- Cephalops longiductulis De Meyer, 1990
- Cephalops longipennis (Brunetti, 1927)
- Cephalops longisetosus (Hardy, 1950)
- Cephalops longistigmatis Yang & Xu, 1998
- Cephalops longistylis De Meyer, 1990
- Cephalops lubuti (Curran, 1929)
- Cephalops lucidus (Hardy, 1950)
- Cephalops lusingensis (Hardy, 1952)
- Cephalops lusitanicus Kehlmaier & Andrade, 2016
- Cephalops macrothrix (Hardy, 1964)
- Cephalops maculiventris (Brunetti, 1927)
- Cephalops magnimembrus De Meyer, 1992
- Cephalops mainensis (Cresson, 1911)
- Cephalops mashobraensis (Kapoor, Grewal & Sharma, 1987)
- Cephalops megameris (Hardy, 1964)
- Cephalops melanopodis (Hardy, 1953)
- Cephalops metallicus Morakote, 1990
- Cephalops molokaiensis (Grimshaw, 1901)
- Cephalops multidenticulatus De Meyer & Grootaert, 1990
- Cephalops mundulus (Hardy, 1968)
- Cephalops nagatomii (Hardy, 1972)
- Cephalops navus (Hardy, 1952)
- Cephalops nigricoxa Rafael, 1991
- Cephalops nigrifrons Rafael, 1991
- Cephalops nigronitens (Brunetti, 1912)
- Cephalops nigrotarsatus (Grimshaw, 1901)
- Cephalops nitidellus Rafael, 1991
- Cephalops nitidus (Hardy, 1950)
- Cephalops oahuensis (Perkins, 1905)
- Cephalops oberon Coe, 1966
- Cephalops obscuratus (Hardy, 1953)
- Cephalops obstipus (Hardy, 1964)
- Cephalops obtusinervis (Zetterstedt, 1844)
- Cephalops obtusus (Hardy, 1949)
- Cephalops orbiculatus Yang & Xu, 1998
- Cephalops orestes (Hardy, 1972)
- Cephalops pacatus Morakote, 1990
- Cephalops paganus (Hardy, 1965)
- Cephalops palawanensis (Hardy, 1972)
- Cephalops pallidipleura (Curran, 1929)
- Cephalops pallidivittipes De Meyer, 1990
- Cephalops pallipes (Johnson, 1903)
- Cephalops pannonicus (Aczél, 1939)
- Cephalops papuaensis De Meyer & Grootaert, 1990
- Cephalops parmatus De Meyer & Grootaert, 1990
- Cephalops pauculus (Hardy, 1954)
- Cephalops pedernalensis Rafael, 1996
- Cephalops pendleburyi (Brunetti, 1927)
- Cephalops penepauculus (Hardy, 1965)
- Cephalops penultimus Ackland, 1993
- Cephalops perkinsiellae (Hardy, 1953)
- Cephalops perpaucus (Hardy, 1950)
- Cephalops perspicuus (Meijere, 1907)
- Cephalops phaethus (Hardy & Knowlton, 1939)
- Cephalops philippinensis (Hardy, 1949)
- Cephalops ponti Rafael, 1991
- Cephalops proditus (Hardy, 1964)
- Cephalops pulvillatus (Kertész, 1915)
- Cephalops quasilubuti (Hardy, 1962)
- Cephalops robustus De Meyer, 1992
- Cephalops rotundipennis (Grimshaw, 1901)
- Cephalops ruandensis (Hardy, 1950)
- Cephalops saegeri (Hardy, 1961)
- Cephalops sectus (Hardy, 1964)
- Cephalops seminitidus (Becker, 1897)
- Cephalops shikotanicus Kuznetzov, 1990
- Cephalops shisanlingensis Yang & Xu, 1998
- Cephalops signatus (Becker, 1900)
- Cephalops spirellus Huo & Yang, 2017
- Cephalops splendens De Meyer, 1992
- Cephalops straminipes (Becker, 1900)
- Cephalops stygius (Hardy, 1948)
- Cephalops subultimus Collin, 1956
- Cephalops swezeyi (Perkins, 1905)
- Cephalops taiwanensis De Meyer, 1992
- Cephalops talyshensis Kuznetzov, 1990
- Cephalops terraereginensis De Meyer, 1992
- Cephalops terryi (Perkins, 1905)
- Cephalops tibetanus (Yang & Xu, 1987)
- Cephalops timberlakei (Hardy, 1953)
- Cephalops titania Coe, 1966
- Cephalops titanus (Hardy, 1964)
- Cephalops transversalis Rafael, 1991
- Cephalops trichostylis (Hardy, 1964)
- Cephalops turkmenorum Kuznetzov, 1990
- Cephalops ugandensis De Meyer, 1992
- Cephalops ultimus (Becker, 1900)
- Cephalops uluhe (Hardy, 1953)
- Cephalops validus (Hardy, 1972)
- Cephalops varipes (Meigen, 1824)
- Cephalops varius (Cresson, 1911)
- Cephalops villifemoralis (Hardy, 1954)
- Cephalops villosiscutum (Hardy, 1962)
- Cephalops vinnulus (Hardy, 1949)
- Cephalops visendus (Hardy, 1950)
- Cephalops vittipes (Zetterstedt, 1844)
- Cephalops xanthocnemis (Perkins, 1905)
- Cephalops yoshiyasui Morakote, 1990
- Cephalops zululandicus (Hardy, 1949)
