= Collinias =

Scientific classification
- Kingdom: Animalia
- Phylum: Arthropoda
- Class: Insecta
- Order: Diptera
- Family: Pipunculidae
- Subfamily: Pipunculinae
- Tribe: Microcephalopsini
- Genus: Collinias; Aczél, 1940

Type species
- Pipunculus heterostigmus Perkins, 1905

Genus of insects

Collinias is a genus of flies belonging to the family Pipunculidae.

== Species ==
- Collinias croceus Skevington, 2006
- Collinias dolabratus Skevington, 2006
- Collinias fulvicaudus De Meyer, 1996
- Collinias heterostigmus (Perkins, 1905)
- Collinias imparilis (Hardy, 1968)
- Collinias leechi (Hardy, 1972)
- Collinias limitaris (Collin, 1929)
- Collinias schlingeri Skevington, 2006
- Collinias vitiensis (Muir, 1906)
