= Amazunculus =

Scientific classification
- Kingdom: Animalia
- Phylum: Arthropoda
- Clade: Pancrustacea
- Class: Insecta
- Order: Diptera
- Family: Pipunculidae
- Subfamily: Pipunculinae
- Tribe: Eudorylini
- Genus: Amazunculus; Rafael, 1986

Type species
- Dorilas platypodus Hardy, 1950

Genus of flies

Amazunculus is a genus of flies in the family Pipunculidae.

== Species ==
- Amazunculus besti Rafael, 1986
- Amazunculus claripennis Rafael & Rosa, 1992
- Amazunculus cordigaster Galinkin & Rafael, 2008
- Amazunculus deargentatus Galinkin & Rafael, 2008
- Amazunculus duckei Galinkin & Rafael, 2008
- Amazunculus platypodus (Hardy, 1950)
