= Allomethus =

Scientific classification
- Kingdom: Animalia
- Phylum: Arthropoda
- Clade: Pancrustacea
- Class: Insecta
- Order: Diptera
- Family: Pipunculidae
- Subfamily: Pipunculinae
- Tribe: Eudorylini
- Genus: Allomethus; Hardy, 1943

Type species
- Allomethus brimleyi Hardy, 1943

Genus of flies

Allomethus is a genus of flies in the family Pipunculidae.

== Species ==
- Allomethus brimleyi Hardy, 1943
- Allomethus catharinensis Rafael, 1991
- Allomethus mysticus Rapp, 1943
- Allomethus rotundicornis (Hardy, 1954)
- Allomethus unicicolis Skevington, 2002
