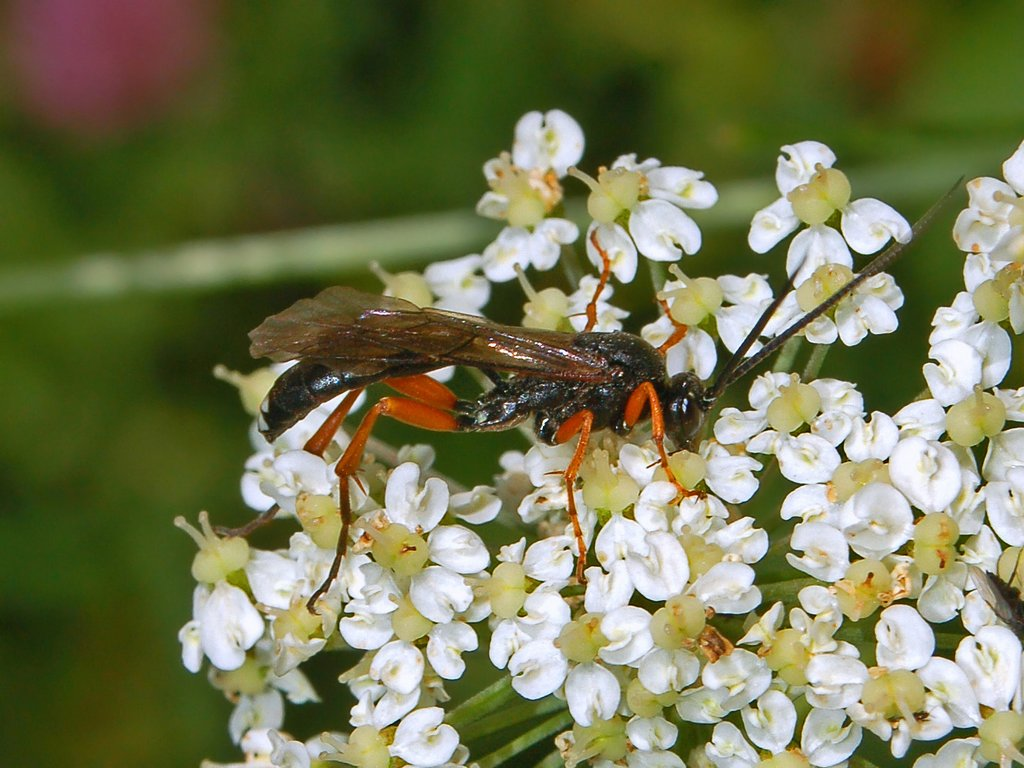
- Virgichneumon maculicauda - Male

Scientific classification
- Kingdom: Animalia
- Phylum: Arthropoda
- Class: Insecta
- Order: Hymenoptera
- Family: Ichneumonidae
- Genus: Virgichneumon
- Species: V. maculicauda

Binomial name
- Virgichneumon maculicauda (Perkins, 1953)

Synonyms
- Barichneumon maculicauda Perkins, 1953

= Virgichneumon maculicauda =

Species of wasp

Virgichneumon maculicauda is a species belonging to the family Ichneumonidae subfamily Ichneumoninae. It is a parasitoid of the Cinnabar moth.

== Distribution ==
This species is mainly found in Belgium, British Isles, Germany, Poland, France, Italy, Russia and Spain.

== Description ==
Virgichneumon maculicauda has a black body and yellow-orange legs. On the tip of the abdomen, tergite 5 is stained with white spots (hence the species name maculicauda, meaning with spots on the tail).

== Bibliography ==
- Wesmael, C. (1845) Tentamen dispositionis methodicae. Ichneumonum Belgii., Nouveaux Memoires de l'Academie Royale des Sciences, des Lettres et Beaux-Arts de Belgique. 18(1944):1-239.
- Perkins, J.F. (1953) Notes on British Ichneumonidae with descriptions of new species (Hym., Ichneumonidae)., Bulletin of the British Museum (Natural History), Entomology series. 3:103-176.
