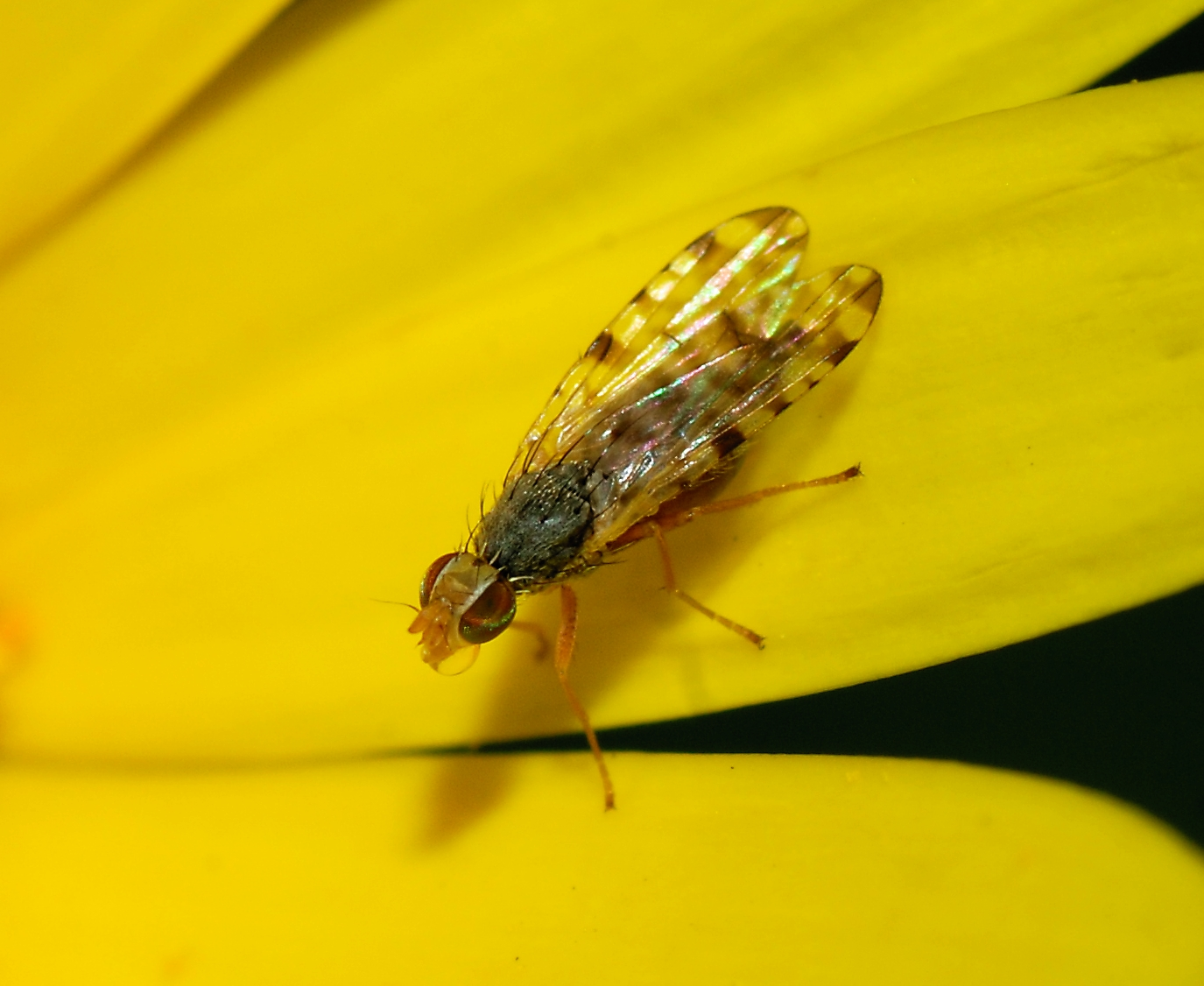
- Dioxyna bidentis

Scientific classification
- Kingdom: Animalia
- Phylum: Arthropoda
- Class: Insecta
- Order: Diptera
- Family: Tephritidae
- Subfamily: Tephritinae
- Tribe: Tephritini
- Genus: Dioxyna; Frey, 1945

Type species
- Trypeta sororcula Wiedemann, 1830

= Dioxyna =

Genus of flies

Dioxyna is a genus of fruit flies in the family Tephritidae. There are about 10 described species in Dioxyna.

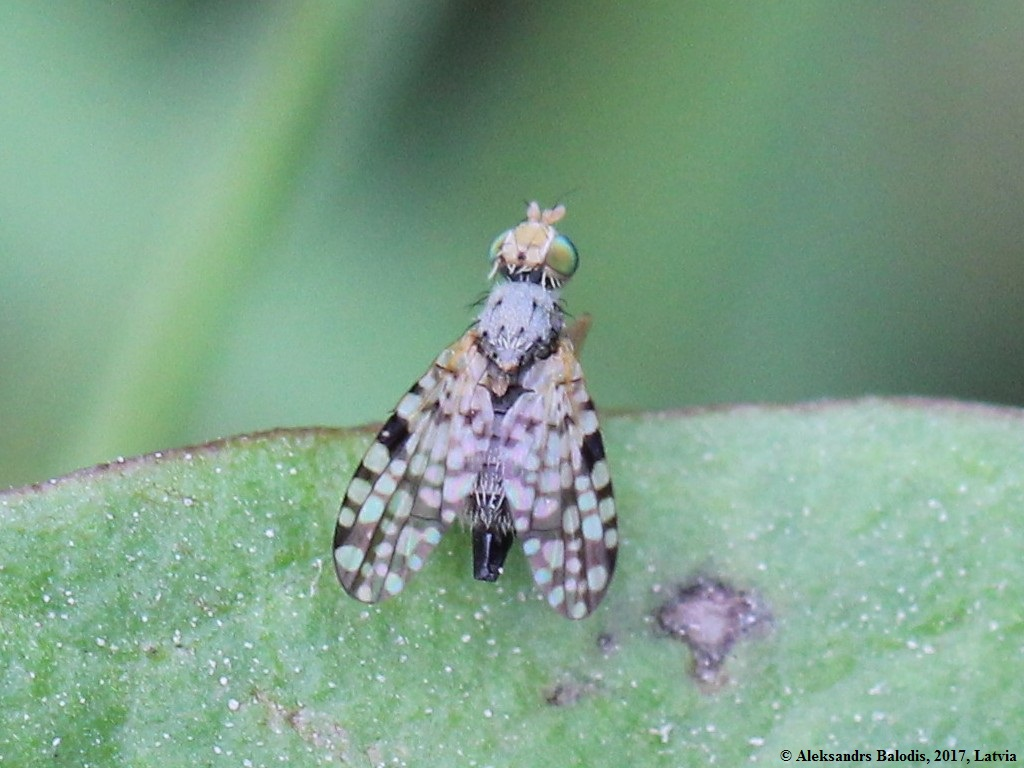
Dioxyna bidentis

Dioxyna bidentis (video)

== Species ==
- Dioxyna bidentis (Robineau-Desvoidy, 1830)
- Dioxyna brachybasis Hardy, 1988
- Dioxyna chilensis (Macquart, 1843)
- Dioxyna conflicta (Curran, 1929)
- Dioxyna crockeri (Curran, 1934)
- Dioxyna hyalina Hardy & Drew, 1996
- Dioxyna peregrina (Loew, 1873)
- Dioxyna picciola (Bigot, 1857)
- Dioxyna planicapitis (Hering, 1941)
- Dioxyna sororcula (Wiedemann, 1830)
- Dioxyna thomae (Curran, 1928)
