= Dioxyna thomae =

Scientific classification
- Kingdom: Animalia
- Phylum: Arthropoda
- Class: Insecta
- Order: Diptera
- Family: Tephritidae
- Subfamily: Tephritinae
- Tribe: Tephritini
- Genus: Dioxyna
- Species: D. thomae

Binomial name
- Dioxyna thomae (Curran, 1928)

Synonyms
- Ensina thomae Curran, 1928

Species of fly

Dioxyna thomae is a species of tephritid or fruit flies in the genus Dioxyna of the family Tephritidae.

== Distribution ==
Virgin Islands.
