= Basileunculus =

Scientific classification
- Kingdom: Animalia
- Phylum: Arthropoda
- Clade: Pancrustacea
- Class: Insecta
- Order: Diptera
- Family: Pipunculidae
- Subfamily: Pipunculinae
- Tribe: Eudorylini
- Genus: Basileunculus; Rafael, 1986

Type species
- Pipunculus rex Curran, 1934

Genus of flies

Basileunculus is a genus of flies in the family Pipunculidae.

== Species ==
- Basileunculus aliceae Rafael, 1987
- Basileunculus interruptus (Malloch, 1912)
- Basileunculus rex (Curran, 1934)
