= Dioxyna crockeri =

Scientific classification
- Kingdom: Animalia
- Phylum: Arthropoda
- Class: Insecta
- Order: Diptera
- Family: Tephritidae
- Subfamily: Tephritinae
- Tribe: Tephritini
- Genus: Dioxyna
- Species: D. crockeri

Binomial name
- Dioxyna crockeri (Curran, 1934)

Synonyms
- Paroxyna crockeri Curran, 1934

Species of fly

Dioxyna crockeri is a species of tephritid or fruit flies in the genus Dioxyna of the family Tephritidae.

== Distribution ==
Galapagos Islands.
