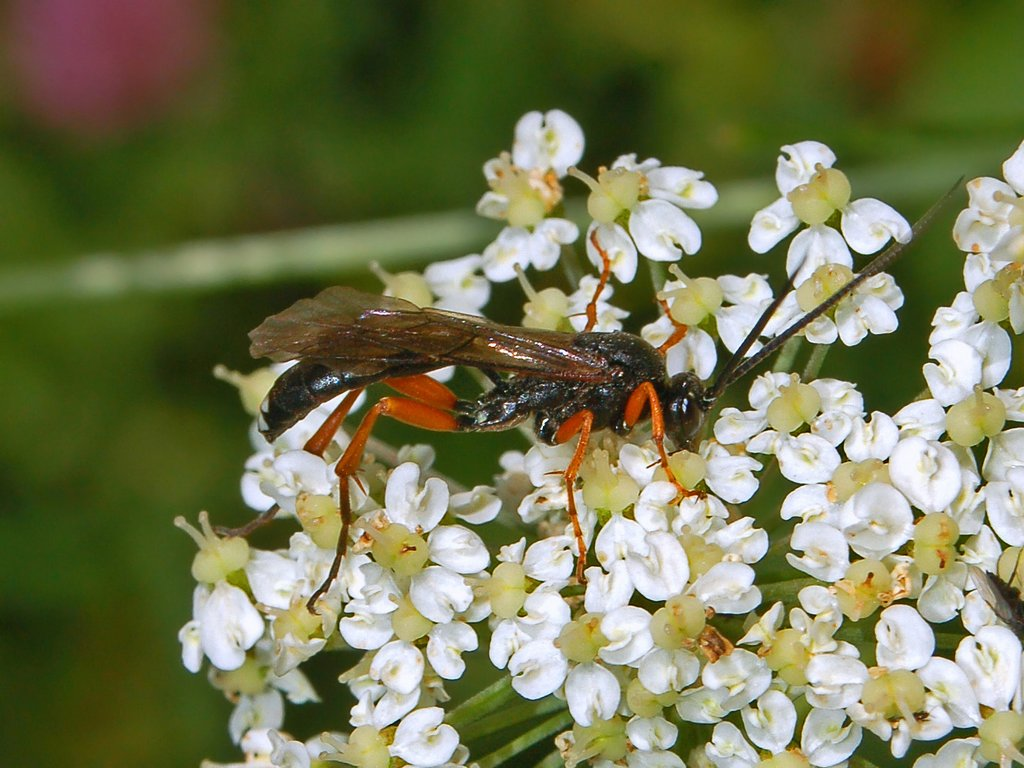
- Virgichneumon maculicauda

Scientific classification
- Kingdom: Animalia
- Phylum: Arthropoda
- Class: Insecta
- Order: Hymenoptera
- Family: Ichneumonidae
- Subfamily: Ichneumoninae
- Genus: Virgichneumon; Heinrich, 1977

= Virgichneumon =

Genus of wasps

Virgichneumon is a genus of wasps belonging to the family Ichneumonidae subfamily Ichneumoninae.

== Species ==
Species within this genus include:

- Virgichneumon albilineatus
- Virgichneumon albomarginatus
- Virgichneumon albosignatus
- Virgichneumon atricolor
- Virgichneumon callicerus
- Virgichneumon digrammus
- Virgichneumon distincticornis
- Virgichneumon dumeticola
- Virgichneumon extremator
- Virgichneumon faunus
- Virgichneumon inopinatus
- Virgichneumon judaicus
- Virgichneumon krapinensis
- Virgichneumon levicoxa
- Virgichneumon maculicauda
- Virgichneumon monostagon
- Virgichneumon nivaliensis
- Virgichneumon seticornutus
- Virgichneumon spicicornis
- Virgichneumon subcyaneus
- Virgichneumon tenuicornis
- Virgichneumon tenuipes
- Virgichneumon tergenus
- Virgichneumon texanus
- Virgichneumon zebratus
