= Dioxyna peregrina =

Scientific classification
- Kingdom: Animalia
- Phylum: Arthropoda
- Class: Insecta
- Order: Diptera
- Family: Tephritidae
- Subfamily: Tephritinae
- Tribe: Tephritini
- Genus: Dioxyna
- Species: D. peregrina

Binomial name
- Dioxyna peregrina (Loew, 1873)

Synonyms
- Trypeta peregrina Loew, 1873

Species of fly

Dioxyna peregrina is a species of fruit fly in the genus Dioxyna of the family Tephritidae.

== Distribution ==
These flies live in Brazil.
