= Dioxyna chilensis =

Scientific classification
- Kingdom: Animalia
- Phylum: Arthropoda
- Class: Insecta
- Order: Diptera
- Family: Tephritidae
- Subfamily: Tephritinae
- Tribe: Tephritini
- Genus: Dioxyna
- Species: D. chilensis

Binomial name
- Dioxyna chilensis (Macquart, 1843)

Synonyms
- Ensina chilensis Macquart, 1843; Ensina obscurella Blanchard, 1854

Species of fly

Dioxyna chilensis is a species of tephritid or fruit flies in the genus Dioxyna of the family Tephritidae found in South America. They were named in 1843 by Macquart after Chile

== Distribution ==
Peru, Bolivia, Chile, Argentina.
