= Priabona florissantius =

Priabona florissantius Temporal range: Priabonian

Scientific classification
- Kingdom: Animalia
- Phylum: Arthropoda
- Class: Insecta
- Order: Diptera
- Family: Pipunculidae
- Subfamily: Nephrocerinae
- Genus: †Priabona; Archibald, Kehlmaier, & Mathewes, 2014
- Species: †P. florissantius

Binomial name
- †Priabona florissantius (Carpenter & Hull) Archibald, Kehlmaier, & Mathewes, 2014

Synonyms
- Protonephrocerus florissantius

Extinct species of fly

Priabona is an extinct genus of big-headed flies in the dipteran subfamily Nephrocerinae, within which it is one of only two genera. The genus contains a single described species, Priabona florissantius. Priabona is known from a single Late Eocene fossil from western North America.

== History and classification ==
Priabona is known from a compression-impression fossil preserved in fine shale of the Florissant Formation in Colorado. The formation is composed of successive lake deposits which have preserved a diverse assemblage of insects. The insects and plants suggest a climate similar to modern Southeastern North America, with a number of taxa represented that are now found in the subtropics to tropics and confined to the Old World. When Priabona was described, the Florissant formation was considered to be Miocene in age, based on the flora and fauna preserved. Subsequent research and fossil descriptions permitted a re-examined dating, and by 1985 the formation had been reassigned to an Oligocene age. Further refinement of the formation's age using radiometric dating of sanidine crystals has resulted in an age of 34 million years, which places the formation in the Late Eocene Priabonian stage.

At the time of description the holotype specimen, number 3976 was deposited in the Museum of Comparative Zoology paleontology collections at Harvard University. Placement of the group has changed several times, with Nepherocerus Metanephrocerus Priabona and Protonephrocerus being placed in the pipunculid subfamily Nephrocerinae from 1948 until 2014. The placement of the tribe Protonephrocerini, containing Metanephrocerus and Protonephrocerus, was challenged in 2014 by Kehlmaier, Dierick and Skevington who suggested inclusion of the genera made Nephrocerinae paraphyletic. As such they elevated the tribe Protonephrocerini to the subfamily rank as Protonephrocerinae, leaving only Nephrocerus and Priabona in Nephrocerinae. The species was originally placed into the genus Protonephrocerus by Frank M. Carpenter and F.M. Hull with their type description in 1939. The species was moved in 2014, based on a redescription of the type specimen, to the new genus Priabona. The generic epithet "Priabona" is taken from Priabonian, the age of the Florissant Formation.

== Description ==
P. florissantius has a body length of 4.5 millimetres (0.18 in), with the details of the head mostly indistinct. There appears to be a notch between the eyes which runs halfway up the rear-side of the head capsule. The wings of the holotype are 4.6 millimetres (0.18 in) and hyaline overall, with a darkening of the pterostigma. The femurs of P. florissantius are unique in that they have several darkened spines on the undersides and which have setae on the front and upper sides, a feature absent in Nephrocerus.
