= Dioxyna planicapitis =

Scientific classification
- Kingdom: Animalia
- Phylum: Arthropoda
- Class: Insecta
- Order: Diptera
- Family: Tephritidae
- Subfamily: Tephritinae
- Tribe: Tephritini
- Genus: Dioxyna
- Species: D. planicapitis

Binomial name
- Dioxyna planicapitis (Hering, 1941)

Synonyms
- Paroxyna planicapitis Hering, 1941

Species of fly

Dioxyna planicapitis is a species of tephritid or fruit flies in the genus Dioxyna of the family Tephritidae.

== Distribution ==
Peru, Bolivia.
