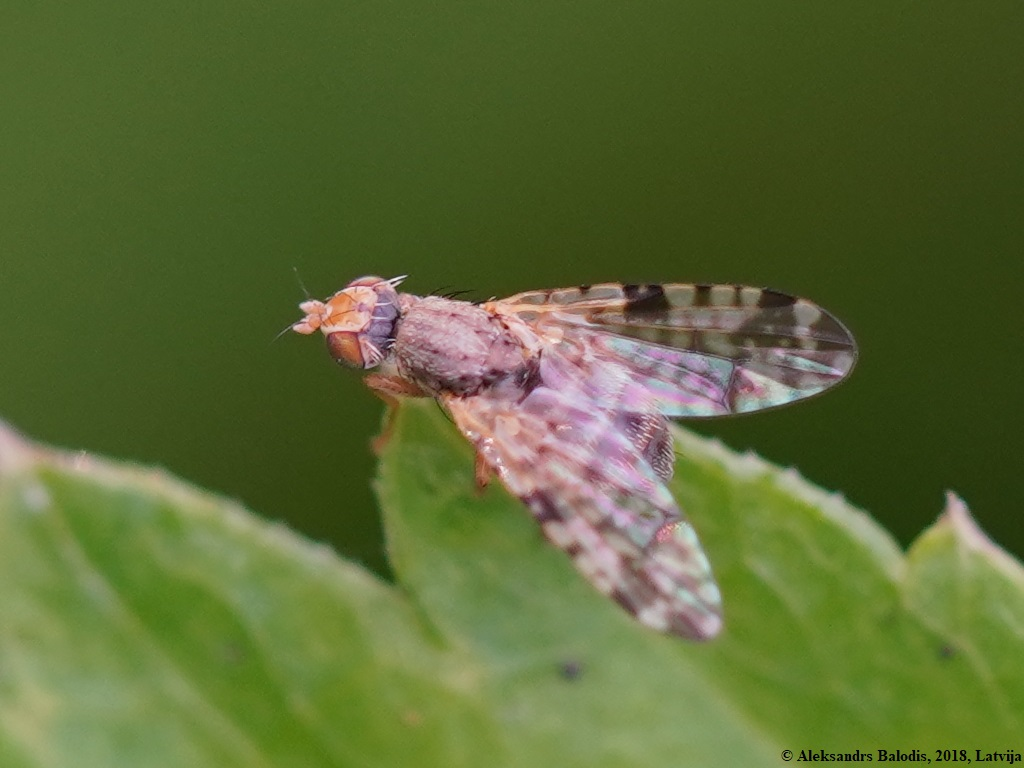

Scientific classification
- Kingdom: Animalia
- Phylum: Arthropoda
- Class: Insecta
- Order: Diptera
- Family: Tephritidae
- Subfamily: Tephritinae
- Tribe: Tephritini
- Genus: Dioxyna
- Species: D. sororcula

Binomial name
- Dioxyna sororcula (Wiedemann, 1830)

Synonyms
- Trypeta sororcula Wiedemann, 1830; Acinia valida Wollaston, 1858; Dioxyna sorocula Zia, 1939; Ensina bisetosa Enderlein, 1911; Ensina bisetosa var. nigrinotum Enderlein, 1911; Ensina vacillans Wollaston, 1858; Leptomyza variipennis Wulp, 1897; Oxyna varipennis Czerny, 1906

= Dioxyna sororcula =

Species of fly

Dioxyna sororcula is a species of tephritid or fruit flies in the genus Dioxyna of the family Tephritidae.

== Distribution ==
Europe, Asia, South Africa & Australia. Introduced Hawaii
