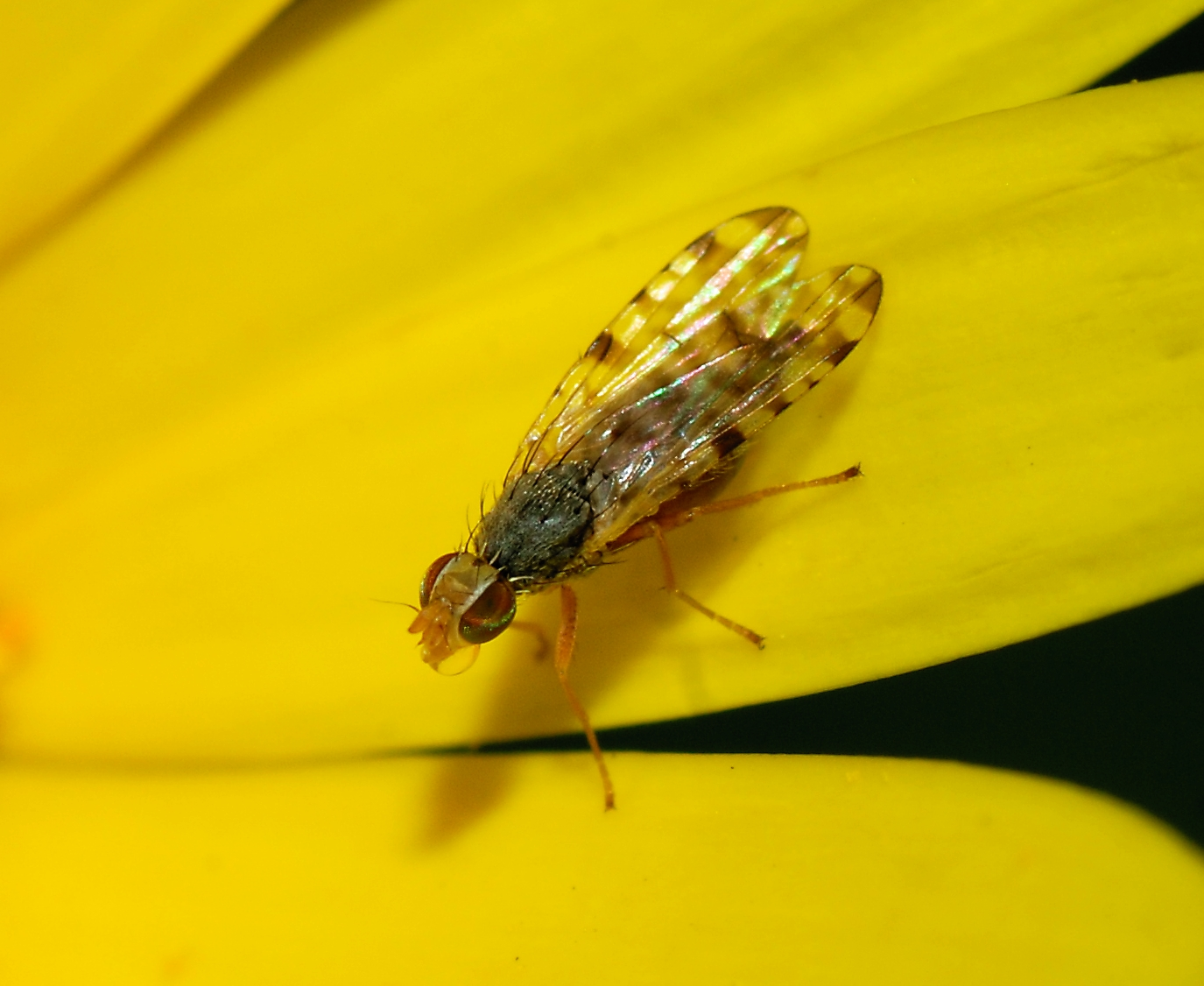

Scientific classification
- Kingdom: Animalia
- Phylum: Arthropoda
- Class: Insecta
- Order: Diptera
- Family: Tephritidae
- Subfamily: Tephritinae
- Tribe: Tephritini
- Genus: Dioxyna
- Species: D. bidentis

Binomial name
- Dioxyna bidentis (Robineau-Desvoidy, 1830)

Synonyms
- Stylia bidentis Robineau-Desvoidy, 1830); Paroxyna cheni Zia, 1937; Paroxyna chusanica Zia, 1937; Paroxyna seguyi Zia, 1937; Paroxyna cilicornis Hering, 1941; Trypeta elongatula Loew, 1844

= Dioxyna bidentis =

Species of fly

Dioxyna bidentis is a species of tephritid or fruit flies in the genus Dioxyna of the family Tephritidae.

== Distribution ==
Europe, North Africa, Central Asia, Iran, China, Russia.
