= John Frederick Perkins =

British entomologist (1910–1983)

John Frederick Perkins FRES (5 May 1910 – 14 May 1983) was an English entomologist. He was born in Paignton, Devon, the son of Zoë Lucy Sherrard Alatau and Robert Cyril Layton Perkins, also a hymenopterist. He was first educated at Newton College (Devon) and graduated with a First class Honours degree from the Imperial College of Science and Technology in 1932. In 1933, he was appointed an Assistant Keeper in the Department of Entomology British Museum (Natural History) where he specialised in Hymenoptera.

He was a Fellow of the Royal Entomological Society.

== Works ==
Partial list

- 1959 Ichneumonidae, key to subfamilies and Ichneumoninae 1. Handbk Ident. Br. Insects 7 (Part 2ai), 1–116. Royal Entomological Society.
- 1960 Hymenoptera: Ichneumonoidea: Ichneumonidae, subfamilies Ichneumoninae 2, Alomyinae, Agriotypinae and Lycorininae. Handbk Ident. Br. Insects 7 (Part 2aii), 1–96. Royal Entomological Society.
- 1962 Perkins, J.F. 1962. On the type species of Förster's genera (Hymenoptera: Ichneumonidae). Bulletin of the British Museum (Natural History). 11:385-483.
- 1976. Hymenoptera Bethyloidea. Handbooks for the Identification of British Insects 6 (3a), 1–38. Royal Entomological Society.
