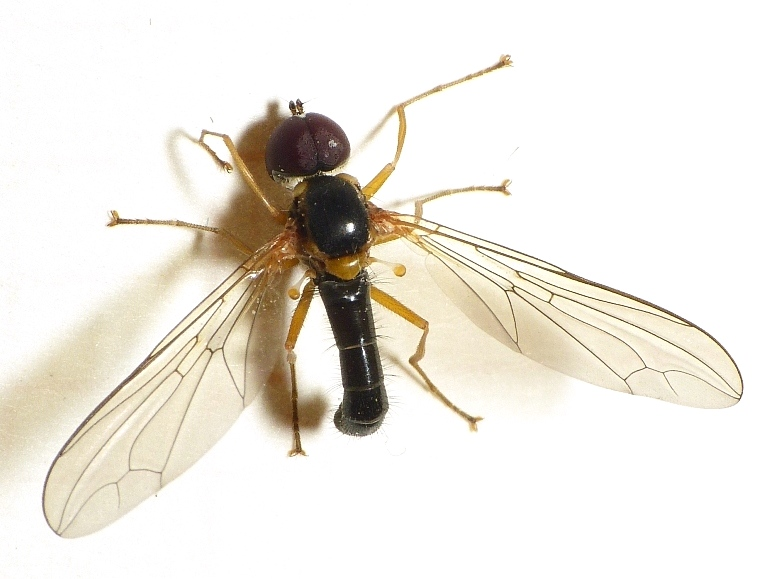

Scientific classification
- Kingdom: Animalia
- Phylum: Arthropoda
- Class: Insecta
- Order: Diptera
- Family: Pipunculidae
- Subfamily: Nephrocerinae
- Tribe: Nephrocerini
- Genus: Nephrocerus
- Species: N. scutellatus

Binomial name
- Nephrocerus scutellatus (Macquart, 1834)

Synonyms
- Pipunculus scutellatus Macquart, 1834

= Nephrocerus scutellatus =

Species of fly

Nephrocerus scutellatus is a species of fly in the family Pipunculidae.

== Distribution ==
Europe.
