= Microcephalopsini =

Scientific classification
- Domain: Eukaryota
- Kingdom: Animalia
- Phylum: Arthropoda
- Class: Insecta
- Order: Diptera
- Family: Pipunculidae
- Subfamily: Pipunculinae
- Tribe: Microcephalopsini

Subfamily of flies

Microcephalopsini is a tribe of big-headed flies (insects in the family Pipunculidae).

== Genera ==
- Collinias Aczél, 1940
- Microcephalops De Meyer, 1989
