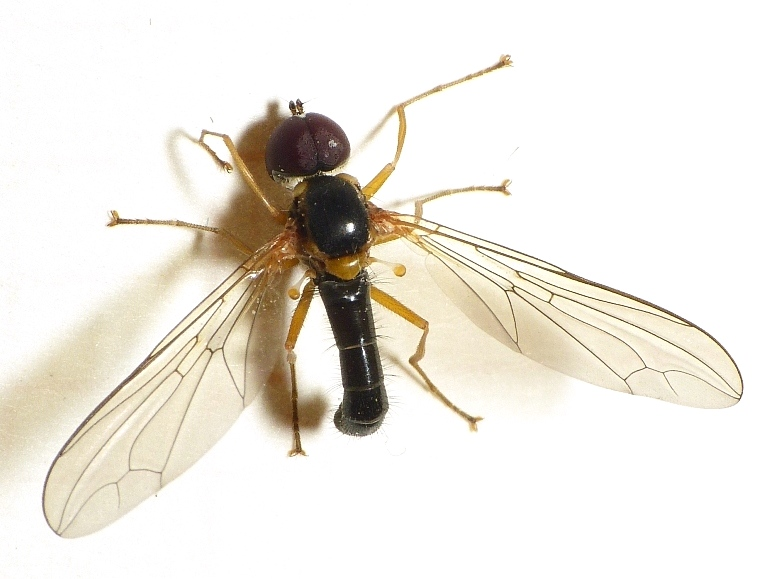
- Nephrocerus scutellatus

Scientific classification
- Kingdom: Animalia
- Phylum: Arthropoda
- Class: Insecta
- Order: Diptera
- Family: Pipunculidae
- Subfamily: Nephrocerinae
- Tribe: Nephrocerini
- Genus: Nephrocerus; Zetterstedt, 1838

Type species
- Nephrocerus lapponicus Zetterstedt, 1838

Synonyms
- Nephrocerus Zetterstedt, 1837

= Nephrocerus =

Genus of insects

Nephrocerus is a genus of flies belonging to the family Pipunculidae.

The species of this genus are found in Europe, Asia and Northern America.

== Species ==
- Nephrocerus acanthostylus Skevington, 2005
- Nephrocerus atrapilus Skevington, 2005
- Nephrocerus auritus Xu & Yang, 1997
- Nephrocerus bullatus Shao, Huo & Yang, 2018
- Nephrocerus corpulentus Skevington, 2005
- Nephrocerus daeckei Johnson, 1903
- Nephrocerus fatalis Churkin, 1991
- Nephrocerus flavicornis Zetterstedt, 1844
- Nephrocerus flexus Morakote, 1988
- Nephrocerus grandis Morakote, 1988
- Nephrocerus japonicus Morakote, 1988
- Nephrocerus lapponicus Zetterstedt, 1838
- Nephrocerus nevskajae Churkin, 1991
- Nephrocerus oligocenicus Carpenter & Hull, 1939
- Nephrocerus paektusanensis Kozánek & Kwon, 1992
- Nephrocerus scutellatus (Macquart, 1834)
- Nephrocerus slossonae Johnson, 1915
- Nephrocerus spineus Morakote, 1988
- Nephrocerus woodi Skevington, 2005
- Nephrocerus zaitzevi Kuznetzov, 1990
