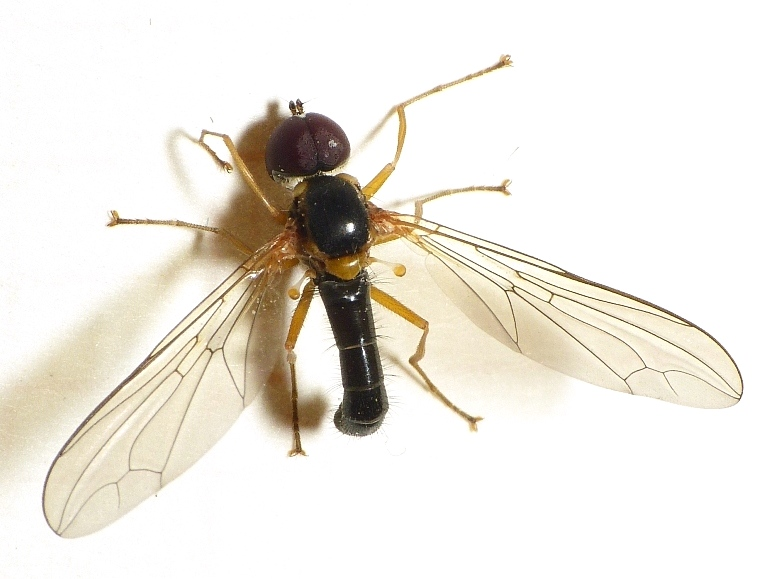
- Nephrocerus scutellatus

Scientific classification
- Domain: Eukaryota
- Kingdom: Animalia
- Phylum: Arthropoda
- Class: Insecta
- Order: Diptera
- Family: Pipunculidae
- Subfamily: Nephrocerinae

= Nephrocerinae =

Subfamily of flies

Nephrocerinae is a subfamily of big-headed flies (insects in the family Pipunculidae).

== Genera ==
- Tribe Nephrocerini
  - Genus Nephrocerus Zetterstedt, 1838
- Tribe incertae sedis
  - Genus †Priabona Archibald, Kehlmaier & Mathewes, 2014 Florissant Formation, Eocene (Priabonian)
