= Protonephrocerus =

Scientific classification
- Kingdom: Animalia
- Phylum: Arthropoda
- Class: Insecta
- Order: Diptera
- Superfamily: Syrphoidea
- Family: Pipunculidae
- Subfamily: Protonephrocerinae
- Genus: Protonephrocerus; Collin, 1931

Type species
- Protonephrocerus chiloensis Collin, 1931

Genus of flies

Protonephrocerus is a genus of flies belonging to the family Pipunculidae.

== Species ==
- Protonephrocerus chiloensis Collin, 1931
- Protonephrocerus flavipilus Skevington, Marques & Rafael, 2021
- Protonephrocerus misionensis Skevington, 2021
