= Robert Cyril Layton Perkins =

British entomologist, ornithologist and naturalist

Robert Perkins
- Born: 15 November 1866; Badminton, England, British Empire
- Died: 29 September 1955 (aged 88); Bovey Tracey, England, United Kingdom
- Education: Jesus College, Oxford
- Known for: Fauna Hawaiiensis
- Children: John
- Awards: Linnean Medal (1912); FRS (1920)
- Scientific career
- Fields: Entomology
- Workplaces: University of Cambridge

Robert Cyril Layton Perkins FRS (15 November 1866 – 29 September 1955) was a distinguished British entomologist, ornithologist, and naturalist noted for his work on the fauna of the islands of Hawaii and on Hymenoptera. He is not to be confused with his son John Frederick Perkins, also a hymenopterist.

== Life ==
Perkins was born on 15 November 1866 at Badminton, Gloucestershire and was educated at King Edward VI Grammar School, St. Albans – his father, Rev Charles Perkins, was the headmaster – and at Merchant Taylors' School before obtaining a scholarship in classics to Jesus College, Oxford in 1885.

After two years of studying classics, he switched to reading Natural History, notwithstanding that he had not studied science at school, having been inspired to make the change by the lectures of Edward Poulton on the colour of insects. His first publications in natural history journals came when he was still studying classics. He obtained a fourth-class degree in the Animal Morphology specialism of the Natural Sciences course in 1889.

=== Hawaii ===
In 1891, a committee appointed by the Royal Society and the British Association for the Advancement of Science asked Perkins to investigate the land fauna of the Hawaiian Islands, and he was engaged in this for almost ten years, conducting research on the islands and carrying out studies at the University of Cambridge on his trips back home.

The fruits of this research first began to be published in 1899, in Fauna Hawaiiensis (edited by David Sharp), and he completed his work in 1913 with a general introduction to the series. For this work, he was awarded the Linnean Society's gold medal for eminent services to zoology.

In October 1901, Perkins married Zoe Lucy Sherrard Alatau, eldest daughter of A.T. Atkinson. The wedding took place in Waialua, on the island of Oahu, Hawaii.

He worked for the Agricultural Department of the Hawaiian Islands between 1902 and 1904, and became the first Director of the experimental station of the Hawaiian Sugar Planters' Association's insect department in 1904, looking at controlling sugar cane pests and weeds with their natural parasites and enemies. In order to collect these, he made journeys to Australia and other places.

=== Retirement ===
Ill-health forced his retirement in 1912, and he moved to Newton Abbot, in Devon. He carried on working on Hawaiian insects and published his research for a further 20 years. He was also known for his work on British insects, including bees and sawflies.

He was elected a Fellow of the Royal Society in 1920 and, having been a Fellow of the Royal Entomological Society for more than 50 years, was appointed an Honorary Fellow in 1954. He died in Bovey Tracey, Devon, aged 88.
