= Cephalopsini =

Scientific classification
- Domain: Eukaryota
- Kingdom: Animalia
- Phylum: Arthropoda
- Class: Insecta
- Order: Diptera
- Family: Pipunculidae
- Subfamily: Pipunculinae
- Tribe: Cephalopsini

Subfamily of flies

Cephalopsini is a tribe of big-headed flies (insects in the family Pipunculidae).

== Genera ==
- Cephalops Fallén, 1810
- Cephalosphaera Enderlein, 1936
