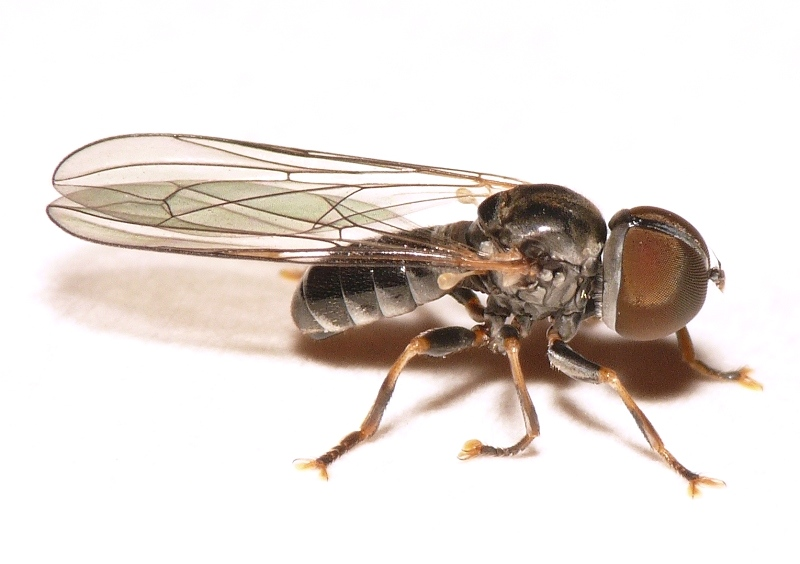
- Clistoabdominalis ruralis

Scientific classification
- Domain: Eukaryota
- Kingdom: Animalia
- Phylum: Arthropoda
- Class: Insecta
- Order: Diptera
- Family: Pipunculidae
- Subfamily: Pipunculinae
- Tribe: Eudorylini

= Eudorylini =

Subfamily of flies

Eudorylini is a tribe of big-headed flies (insects in the family Pipunculidae).

== Genera ==
- Genus Allomethus Hardy, 1943
- Genus Amazunculus Rafael, 1986
- Genus Basileunculus Rafael, 1987
- Genus Claraeola Aczél, 1940
- Genus Clistoabdominalis Skevington, 2001
- Genus Dasydorylas Skevington, 2001
- Genus Elmohardyia Rafael, 1987
- Genus Eudorylas Aczél, 1940
