= D. Elmo Hardy =

American entomologist (1914–2002)

Dilbert Elmo Hardy (September 3, 1914 – October 17, 2002) was an American entomologist at the University of Hawaii who specialized in Diptera systematics.

== Biography ==
Hardy was born on September 3, 1914, in Lehi, Utah. He died on October 17, 2002, in Honolulu, Hawaii. He was married to Agnes Thomas Hardy who played a pivotal role in supporting his education, his career as well as illustrating his scientific articles.

== Legacy ==
In over 70 years of research Hardy published 437 articles and notes in which he named and described nearly 2,000 species in 34 different families of Diptera. He made significant contributions to taxonomy and systematics of flies from the Asia-Pacific Region in particular.

== Works ==
- Pipunculidae and Bibionidae
- Australian/Oceanian Diptera Catalogue Bibionidae
- "Family Scenopinidae (Omphralidae)." In N. Papavero, (ed.) A Catalogue of the Diptera of the Americas South of the United States, pp. 32.1-32.5, Departamento de Zoologia, Secretaria da Agricultura. São Paulo, Brazil, 1966.
- "Family Scenopinidae (Omphralidae)" in A. Stone, C.W. Sabrowsky, W.W. Wirth, R.M. Foote & J.R. Caulson (eds), A Catalogue of Diptera of North America, pp. 354–356, Smithsonian Publication, Washington D.C., 1983.
- (with others) Guide of the insects of Connecticut Part VI. The Diptera or true flies of Connecticut Sixth Fascicle: March flies and gall midges. Bibionidae, Itonididae (Cecidomiidae). Conn. Geol. Nat. Hist. Surv. Bull. 87, 218 pp., 15 pl., 29 figs.
- "The Bibionidae (Diptera) of Nepal, results of the Austrian and the B.P. Bishop Museum Expeditions, 1961 and 1965." Pacific Insects 9(3): 519–536, 1967.
- with Delfinado, M.D. "The Bibionidae (Diptera) of the Philippines." Pacific Insects 11(1): 117–154, 1969.

== Collections ==
- Hardy's Diptera collection is in the Bishop Museum in Hawaii.
