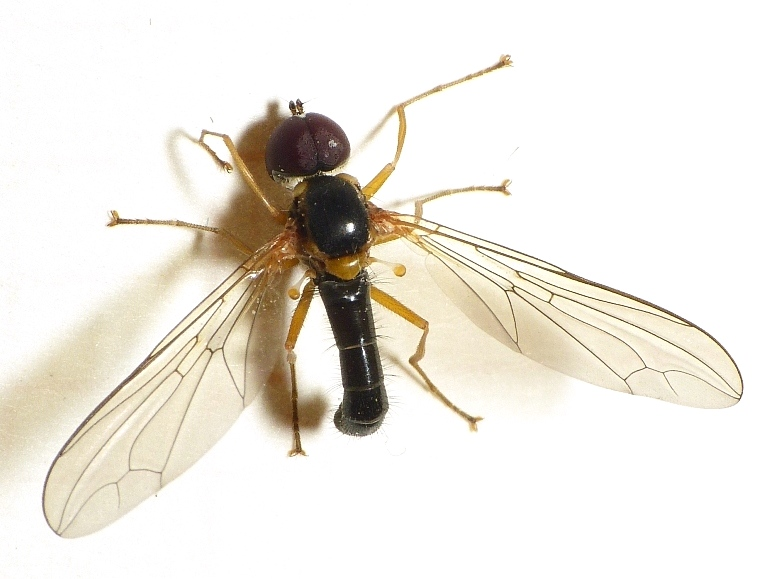
- Nephrocerus scutellatus

Scientific classification
- Domain: Eukaryota
- Kingdom: Animalia
- Phylum: Arthropoda
- Class: Insecta
- Order: Diptera
- Family: Pipunculidae
- Subfamily: Pipunculinae

= Pipunculinae =

Subfamily of flies

Pipunculinae is a subfamily of big-headed flies (insects in the family Pipunculidae).

== Genera ==
- Tribe Cephalopsini
  - Genus Cephalops Fallén, 1810
  - Genus Cephalosphaera Enderlein, 1936
- Tribe Microcephalopsini
  - Genus Collinias Aczél, 1940
  - Genus Microcephalops De Meyer, 1989
- Tribe Eudorylini
  - Genus Allomethus Hardy, 1943
  - Genus Amazunculus Rafael, 1986
  - Genus Basileunculus Rafael, 1987
  - Genus Claraeola Aczél, 1940
  - Genus Clistoabdominalis Skevington, 2001
  - Genus Dasydorylas Skevington, 2001
  - Genus Elmohardyia Rafael, 1987
  - Genus Eudorylas Aczél, 1940
- Tribe Tomosvaryellini
  - Genus Dorylomorpha Aczél, 1939
  - Genus Tomosvaryella Aczél, 1939
- Tribe Pipunculini
  - Genus Pipunculus Latreille, 1802
