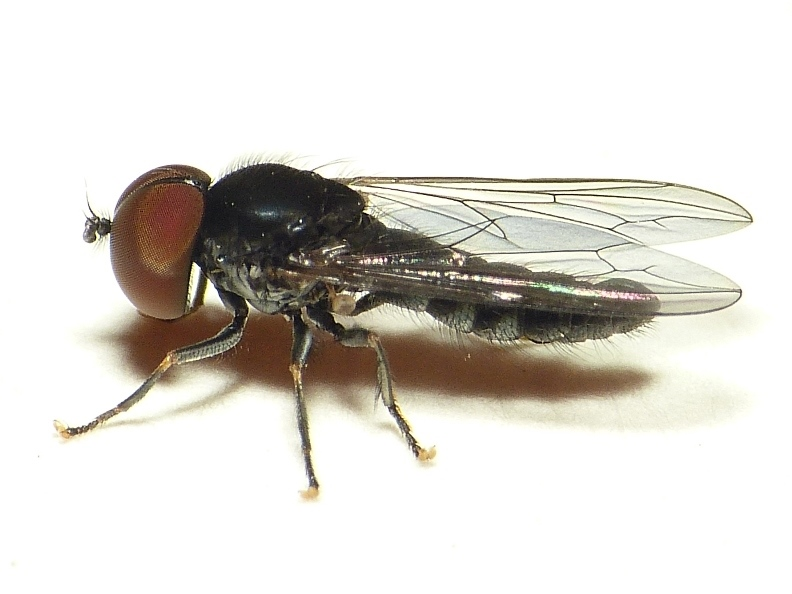
- Verrallia aucta, Chalarinae

Scientific classification
- Kingdom: Animalia
- Phylum: Arthropoda
- Clade: Pancrustacea
- Class: Insecta
- Order: Diptera
- Superfamily: Syrphoidea
- Family: Pipunculidae; Walker, 1834

Subfamilies
- Chalarinae; Nephrocerinae; Pipunculinae; Protonephrocerinae

Synonyms
- Dorilaidae; Dorylaidae

= Pipunculidae =

Pipunculidae Temporal range: Ypresian - Present

Family of flies

Pipunculidae is a family of flies (Diptera) commonly termed big-headed flies, a reference to the large (holoptic) eyes, which cover nearly the entire head. The family is found worldwide and more than 1300 species have been described.

The larvae of Pipunculidae develop as parasitoids almost exclusively in Auchenorrhyncha, the exception being the genus Nephrocerus, whose hosts are adult Tipulidae (crane flies). The larvae develop rapidly within the crane flies before pupating in the soil. In all pipunculids there are only two larval stages. Some species are used as biological control agents in rice fields.

== Evolution ==
Molecular analysis show that Pipunculidae appeared in the Maastrichtian age of the Cretaceous. The oldest fossils of this group were found in the Eocene formations. North American Metanephrocerus belgardeae and Priabona florissantius were collected from the Ypresian and Priabonian deposits, respectively. Younger specimens of Pipunculidae were discovered in the Miocene Dominican amber.

== Taxonomy ==
Taxonomy as shown at the Tree of life, with modification based on Kehlmaier, Dierick and Skevington (2014). The name Pipunculidae is derived from the type genus Pipunculus which is thought to be derived from Latin pepo for pumpkin, thus pipunculus would mean "little pumpkin", referring to the large heads.

Subfamily Chalarinae

- Genus Chalarus Walker, 1834
- Genus Jassidophaga Aczél, 1939
- Genus †Protoverrallia Aczél, 1948 Baltic amber Eocene (Priabonian)
- Genus Verrallia Mik, 1899

Subfamily Nephrocerinae

- Tribe Nephrocerini
  - Genus Nephrocerus Zetterstedt, 1838
- Tribe incertae sedis
  - Genus †Priabona Archibald, Kehlmaier & Mathewes, 2014 Florissant Formation, Eocene (Priabonian)

Subfamily Protonephrocerinae

- Genus Protonephrocerus Collin, 1931
- Genus †Metanephrocerus Carpenter & Hull, 1939 Klondike Mountain Formation, Washington, Eocene (Ypresian) Baltic amber Eocene (Priabonian)

Subfamily Pipunculinae

- Tribe Cephalopsini
  - Genus Cephalops Fallén, 1810
  - Genus Cephalosphaera Enderlein, 1936
- Tribe Microcephalopsini
  - Genus Collinias Aczél, 1940
  - Genus Microcephalops De Meyer, 1989
- Tribe Eudorylini
  - Genus Allomethus Hardy, 1943
  - Genus Amazunculus Rafael, 1986
  - Genus Basileunculus Rafael, 1987
  - Genus Claraeola Aczél, 1940
  - Genus Clistoabdominalis Skevington, 2001
  - Genus Dasydorylas Skevington, 2001
  - Genus Elmohardyia Rafael, 1987
  - Genus Eudorylas Aczél, 1940
- Tribe Tomosvaryellini
  - Genus Dorylomorpha Aczél, 1939
  - Genus Tomosvaryella Aczél, 1939
- Tribe Pipunculini
  - Genus Pipunculus Latreille, 1802

== Gallery ==
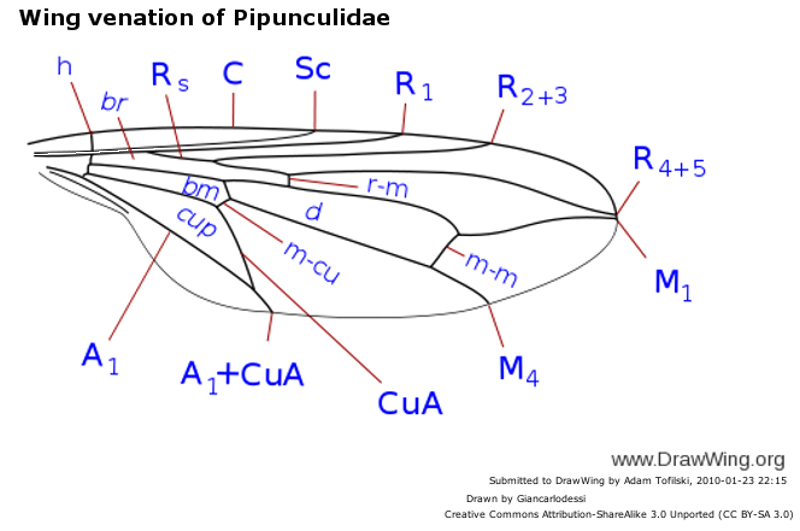
Typical wing venation of Pipunculidae

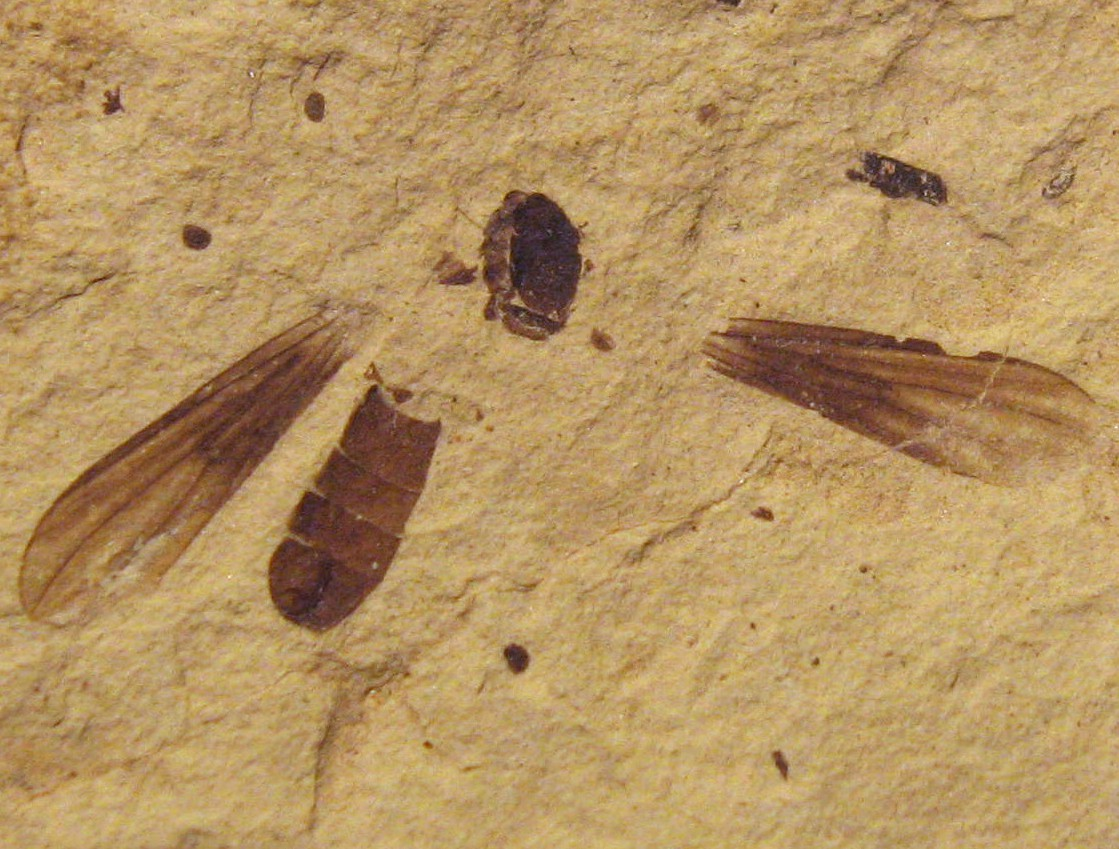
Metanephrocerus belgardeae, Protonephrocerinae

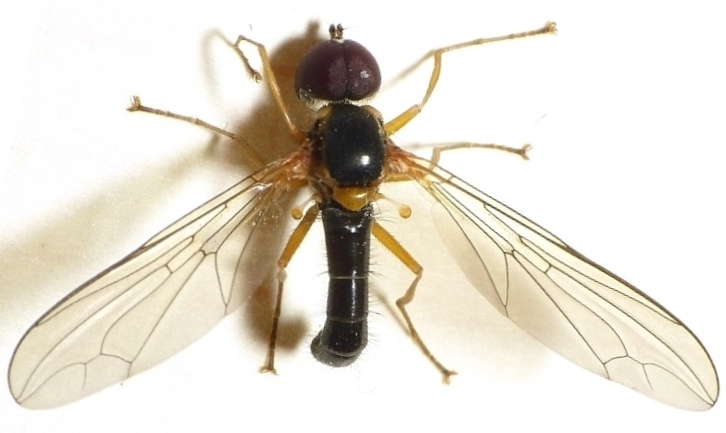
Nephrocerus scutellatus,
Nephrocerinae

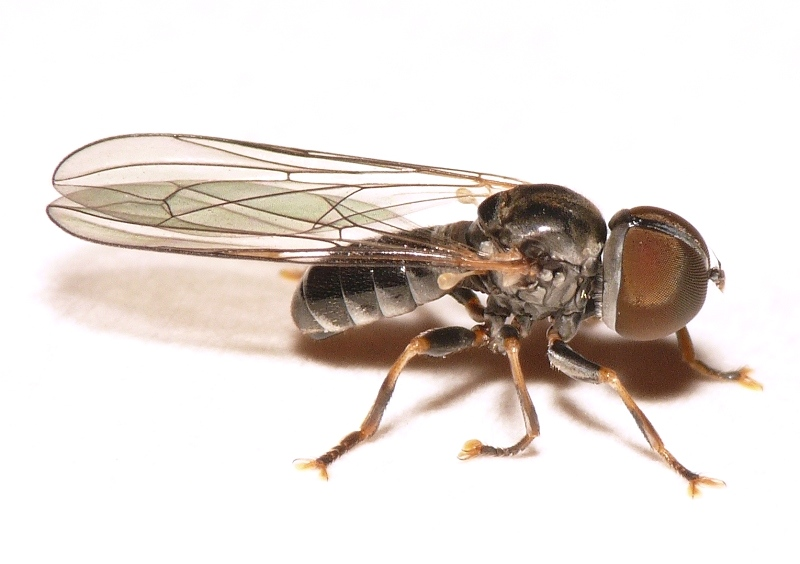
Clistoabdominalis ruralis, Eudorylini, Pipunculinae

== See also ==
- List of Pipunculidae species of Great Britain
