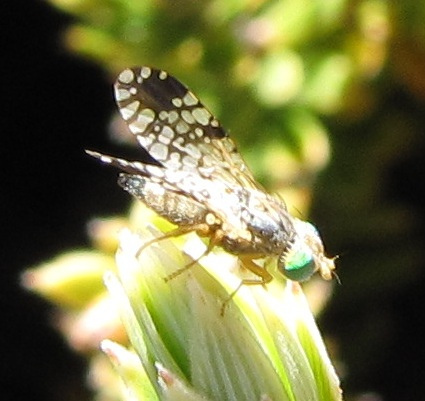
- Trupanea crassipes

Scientific classification
- Kingdom: Animalia
- Phylum: Arthropoda
- Clade: Pancrustacea
- Class: Insecta
- Order: Diptera
- Family: Tephritidae
- Subfamily: Tephritinae
- Tribe: Tephritini
- Genus: Trupanea; Schrank, 1795

Type species
- Trupanea radiata Schrank, 1795

Synonyms
- Tripanea Bezzi, 1924; Trupanea Guettard, 1762; Trypanea Agassiz, 1847; Trypanoidea Bryan, 1924; Urellia Robineau-Desvoidy, 1830

= Trupanea =

Genus of fruit flies

Trupanea is a genus of tephritid or fruit flies in the family Tephritidae.

== Recent changes in nomenclature ==
Tephritis kukunoria Hendel, 1927 transferred to the genus Trupanea as the elder synonym of Trupanea pterostigma Wang, 1996.

== List of species ==
- T. actinobola (Loew, 1873)
- T. ageratae Benjamin, 1934
- T. aira (Walker, 1849)
- T. alboapicata (Malloch, 1931)
- T. aldrichi Aczél, 1953
- T. ambigua (Shiraki, 1933)
- T. amoena (Frauenfeld, 1857)
- T. andobana Munro, 1964
- T. antiqua (Walker, 1853)
- T. apicalis Hardy, 1980
- T. arboreae Hardy, 1980
- T. argentina (Brèthes, 1908)
- T. arizonensis (Malloch, 1942)
- T. artemisiae Hardy, 1980
- T. asteria (Schiner, 1868)
- T. asteroides (Hendel, 1914)
- T. aucta Bezzi, 1913
- T. austera (Hering, 1942)
- T. basiflava (Hering, 1942)
- T. basistriga (Malloch, 1933)
- T. beardsleyi Hardy, 1980
- T. bidensicola Hardy, 1980
- T. bifida Hardy & Drew, 1996
- T. bisdiversa (Bezzi, 1924)
- T. bisetosa (Coquillett, 1899)
- T. bisreducta (Bezzi, 1924)
- T. bistigmosa (Hering, 1941)
- T. bistriga (Malloch, 1933)
- T. bonariensis (Brèthes, 1908)
- T. brasiliensis Aczél, 1953
- T. brevitarsis (Hering, 1941)
- T. browni Munro, 1964
- T. brunneipennis Hardy, 1973
- T. bullocki (Malloch, 1933)
- T. caerulea Munro, 1964
- T. californica (Malloch, 1942)
- T. candida (Hering, 1942)
- T. celaenoptera Hardy, 1980
- T. centralis (Malloch, 1931)
- T. chariessa (Hendel, 1914)
- T. chilensis (Macquart, 1843)
- T. chrysanthemifolii Frias, 1985
- T. colligata Munro, 1964
- T. completa (Malloch, 1931)
- T. conjuncta (Adams, 1904)
- T. constans Munro, 1964
- T. convergens (Hering, 1936)
- T. cosmia (Schiner, 1868)
- T. crassipes (Thomson, 1869)
- T. crassitarsis (Hering, 1940)
- T. cratericola (Grimshaw, 1901)
- T. curvata Munro, 1964
- T. cuspidiflexa Munro, 1964
- T. cyclops (Hendel, 1914)
- T. dacetoptera (Phillips, 1923)
- T. daphne (Wiedemann, 1830)
- T. dealbata Munro, 1964
- T. decepta Hardy, 1970
- T. decora Loew, 1861
- T. dempta Hardy, 1980
- T. denotata Hardy, 1980
- T. digrammata (Hering, 1947)
- T. diluta (Enderlein, 1911)
- T. discyrta Munro, 1964
- T. distincta (Shiraki, 1933)
- T. diversa (Wiedemann, 1830)
- T. dubautiae (Bryan, 1921)
- T. dubia (Malloch, 1931)
- T. dumosa (Munro, 1940)
- T. durvillei (Macquart, 1843)
- T. eclipta Benjamin, 1934
- T. edwardsi (Malloch, 1933)
- T. erasa (Malloch, 1942)
- T. erigeroni Freidberg, 1974
- T. excepta (Malloch, 1933)
- T. extensa (Malloch, 1931)
- T. falcata Munro, 1964
- T. femoralis (Thomson, 1869)
- T. fenwicki (Malloch, 1931)
- T. flavivena (Hering, 1937)
- T. foliosi Frias, 1985
- T. footei Frias, 1985
- T. formosae (Hendel, 1927)
- T. furcifera (Bezzi, 1924)
- T. glauca (Thomson, 1869)
- T. gratiosa (Ito, 1952)
- T. guttistella (Hering, 1951)
- T. helota Hering, 1941
- T. hendeli (Hering, 1941)
- T. heronensis Hardy & Drew, 1996
- T. horologii Munro, 1964
- T. imperfecta (Coquillett, 1902)
- T. inaequabilis (Hering, 1942)
- T. infissa Munro, 1964
- T. inscia Munro, 1960
- T. insularum (Becker, 1908)
- T. intermedia Munro, 1933
- T. isolata Hardy, 1973
- T. jonesi (Curran, 1932)
- T. joycei Hardy, 1980
- T. keralaensis Agarwal, Grewal et al., 1989
- T. kraussi Munro, 1964
- T. latinota Hardy, 1988
- T. lignoptera (Munro, 1929)
- T. lilloi Aczél, 1953
- T. limpidapex (Grimshaw, 1901)
- T. lipochaetae Hardy, 1980
- T. longipennis (Malloch, 1931)
- T. lunifrons (Bezzi, 1924)
- T. lyneborgi Hardy, 1970
- T. maculaminuta (Munro, 1929)
- T. maculigera Foote, 1960
- T. mallochi (Hering, 1940)
- T. marginalis Hardy, 1980
- T. megaspila Hardy, 1980
- T. melantherae Munro, 1964
- T. metoeca (Hendel, 1914)
- T. mevarna (Walker, 1849)
- T. modesta (Blanchard, 1854)
- T. multisetosa (Hering, 1936)
- T. mutabilis (Hering, 1941)
- T. neodaphne (Malloch, 1933)
- T. nigricornis (Coquillett, 1899)
- T. nigricornuta (Hering, 1942)
- T. nigripennis Hardy, 1980
- T. nigriseta (Malloch, 1933)
- T. notata Hardy & Drew, 1996
- T. novarae (Schiner, 1868)
- T. nubilata (Hering, 1936)
- T. nudipes (Hering, 1938)
- T. nymphula (Blanchard, 1854)
- T. obsoleta (Hendel, 1914)
- T. ochthlera Munro, 1964
- T. okinawaensis Shiraki, 1968
- T. omphale (Hering, 1936)
- T. oppleta Munro, 1964
- T. opprimata (Hering, 1941)
- T. orfila (Hering, 1940)
- T. ornum Norrbom, 1999
- T. pantosticta Hardy, 1980
- T. paradaphne (Hering, 1953)
- T. paragoga (Hering, 1936)
- T. paraplesia (Hendel, 1914)
- T. patagonica (Brèthes, 1908)
- T. paupercula (Hering, 1940)
- T. pekeloi Hardy, 1980
- T. pentheres (Hendel, 1914)
- T. pentziana (Munro, 1933)
- T. perkinsi Hardy, 1980
- T. peruviana (Malloch, 1942)
- T. phrycta (Hendel, 1914)
- T. pictofracta Munro, 1964
- T. platensis (Brèthes, 1908)
- T. plaumanni (Hering, 1940)
- T. pollens Munro, 1957
- T. polyclona (Loew, 1873)
- T. porteri (Séguy, 1933)
- T. proavita (Hering, 1939)
- T. prolata Hardy & Drew, 1996
- T. prominens Munro, 1964
- T. propinqua (Hering, 1941)
- T. pseudoamoena Freidberg, 1974
- T. pseudodaphne Hering, 1942
- T. pseudovicina (Hering, 1947)
- T. pteralis Agarwal, Grewal et al., 1989
- T. pubescens (Kieffer & Jörgensen, 1910)
- T. pusilla Hardy & Drew, 1996
- T. putata (Hering, 1940)
- T. queenslandensis Hardy & Drew, 1996
- T. radifera (Coquillett, 1899)
- T. reducta (Hendel, 1914)
- T. renschi (Hering, 1941)
- T. repleta (Bezzi, 1918)
- T. richteri Hering, 1956
- T. rufa Hardy, 1988
- T. sandoana (Munro, 1938)
- T. sarangana (Curran, 1931)
- T. sedata Munro, 1957
- T. semiguttata (Becker, 1919)
- T. setifrons (Malloch, 1933)
- T. shaula Dirlbek, 1975
- T. signata Foote, 1960
- T. simplex (Malloch, 1932)
- T. sirhindiensis Agarwal & Kapoor, 1988
- T. solivaga (Hering, 1942)
- T. spadix Munro, 1964
- T. stellata (Fuesslin, 1775)
- T. stenoptera (Hendel, 1914)
- T. stulta (Hering, 1941)
- T. subsetosa Munro, 1964
- T. superdecora (Bezzi, 1924)
- T. swezeyi (Bryan, 1921)
- T. syrmophora (Hering, 1942)
- T. teitensis Munro, 1964
- T. terryi Hardy, 1988
- T. tersa Munro, 1964
- T. thuriferae Frias, 1985
- T. tubulata Munro, 1964
- T. tucumanensis (Malloch, 1933)
- T. unimaculata (Malloch, 1931)
- T. unimaculosa (Hering, 1941)
- T. vernoniae Hardy, 1973
- T. vicina (Wulp, 1900)
- T. viciniformis Foote, 1987
- T. vittigera (Malloch, 1931)
- T. vulpina (Hering, 1942)
- T. watti (Malloch, 1931)
- T. wheeleri (Curran, 1932)
- T. xanthochaeta (Munro, 1929)
- T. zonata (Hendel, 1914)
