= Pseudodinera =

Scientific classification
- Kingdom: Animalia
- Phylum: Arthropoda
- Class: Insecta
- Order: Diptera
- Family: Tachinidae
- Subfamily: Dexiinae
- Tribe: Dexiini
- Genus: Pseudodinera; Brauer & von Berganstamm, 1891

Type species
- Pseudodinera nigripes Brauer & von Bergenstamm, 1891

Genus of flies

Pseudodinera is a genus of flies in the family Tachinidae.

== Species ==
- Pseudodinera nigripes Brauer & von Berganstamm, 1891
- Pseudodinera spinigera (Thomson, 1869)

== Distribution ==
South Africa.
