= Trupanea mallochi =

Scientific classification
- Kingdom: Animalia
- Phylum: Arthropoda
- Clade: Pancrustacea
- Class: Insecta
- Order: Diptera
- Family: Tephritidae
- Subfamily: Tephritinae
- Tribe: Tephritini
- Genus: Trupanea
- Species: T. mallochi

Binomial name
- Trupanea mallochi Hering, 1940

Synonyms
- Trypanea mallochi Hering, 1940

Species of fly

Trupanea mallochi is a species of fruit fly in the genus Plaumannimyia of the family Tephritidae.

== Distribution ==
Mexico, Nicaragua, Costa Rica.
