= Pterotopeza tarsalis =

Scientific classification
- Kingdom: Animalia
- Phylum: Arthropoda
- Class: Insecta
- Order: Diptera
- Family: Tachinidae
- Subfamily: Exoristinae
- Tribe: Goniini
- Genus: Pterotopeza
- Species: P. tarsalis

Binomial name
- Pterotopeza tarsalis (Schiner, 1868)

Synonyms
- Blepharipeza tarsalis Schiner, 1868

Species of fly

Pterotopeza tarsalis is a genus of flies in the family Tachinidae.

== Distribution ==
Venezuela
