= Trupanea daphne =

Scientific classification
- Kingdom: Animalia
- Phylum: Arthropoda
- Clade: Pancrustacea
- Class: Insecta
- Order: Diptera
- Family: Tephritidae
- Subfamily: Tephritinae
- Tribe: Tephritini
- Genus: Trupanea
- Species: T. daphne

Binomial name
- Trupanea daphne (Wiedemann, 1830)

Synonyms
- Trypeta duplicata Wiedemann, 1830; Trypeta meteorica Thomson, 1869; Trypanea dapne Aczél, 1950

Species of fly

Trupanea daphne is a species of tephritid or fruit flies in the genus Trupanea of the family Tephritidae.

== Distribution ==
Uruguay, Argentina.
