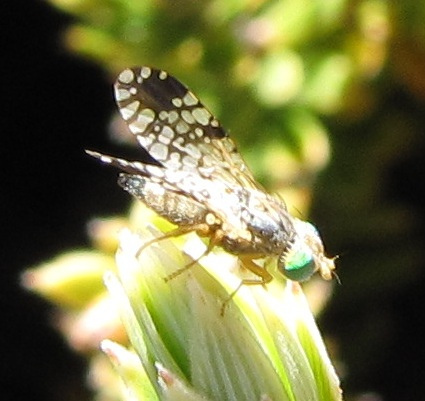
- Trupanea crassipes

Scientific classification
- Kingdom: Animalia
- Phylum: Arthropoda
- Clade: Pancrustacea
- Class: Insecta
- Order: Diptera
- Family: Tephritidae
- Subfamily: Tephritinae
- Tribe: Tephritini
- Genus: Trupanea
- Species: T. crassipes

Binomial name
- Trupanea crassipes (Thomson, 1869)

Synonyms
- Trypeta crassipes Thomson, 1869

= Trupanea crassipes =

Species of fly

Trupanea crassipes is a species of tephritid or fruit flies in the genus Trupanea of the family Tephritidae.

== Distribution ==
Hawaiian Islands.
