= Trupanea femoralis =

Scientific classification
- Kingdom: Animalia
- Phylum: Arthropoda
- Clade: Pancrustacea
- Class: Insecta
- Order: Diptera
- Family: Tephritidae
- Subfamily: Tephritinae
- Tribe: Tephritini
- Genus: Trupanea
- Species: T. femoralis

Binomial name
- Trupanea femoralis (Thomson, 1869)

Synonyms
- Trypeta femoralis Thomson, 1869; Urellia occidentalis Adams, 1904

Species of fly

Trupanea femoralis is a species of tephritid or fruit flies in the genus Trupanea of the family Tephritidae.

== Distribution ==
United States & Mexico.
