= Trupanea cosmia =

Scientific classification
- Kingdom: Animalia
- Phylum: Arthropoda
- Clade: Pancrustacea
- Class: Insecta
- Order: Diptera
- Family: Tephritidae
- Subfamily: Tephritinae
- Tribe: Tephritini
- Genus: Trupanea
- Species: T. cosmia

Binomial name
- Trupanea cosmia (Schiner, 1868)

Synonyms
- Tephritis cosmia Schiner, 1868

Species of fly

Trupanea cosmia is a species of tephritid or fruit flies in the genus Trupanea of the family Tephritidae.

== Distribution ==
Madeira, India.
