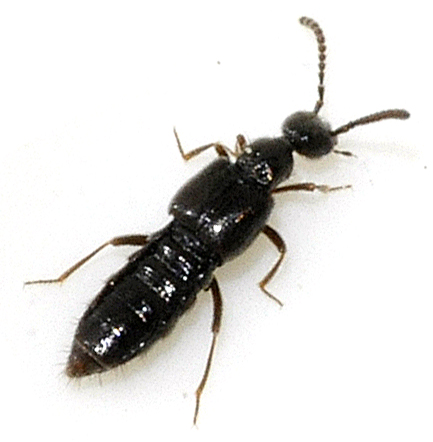
- Autalia rivularis

Scientific classification
- Kingdom: Animalia
- Phylum: Arthropoda
- Clade: Pancrustacea
- Class: Insecta
- Order: Coleoptera
- Suborder: Polyphaga
- Infraorder: Staphyliniformia
- Family: Staphylinidae
- Subfamily: Aleocharinae
- Tribe: Autaliini; Thomson, C.G., 1859

= Autaliini =

Autaliini is a tribe of rove beetles in the subfamily Aleocharinae. It contains five genera, with 55 accepted species. The tribe was first described in 1859 by C.G. Thomson.

== Genera ==
- Attonia
- Autalia
- Compsusa
- Ophioglossa
- Rhopalgastrum
