= T. antiqua =

T. antiqua may refer to one of the following species:

- Thecachampsa antiqua, a species from the extinct genus of Thecachampsa
- Thomasia antiqua, a Mammaliaforme
- Trupanea antiqua, a fruit fly species
