= Pterotopeza =

Scientific classification
- Kingdom: Animalia
- Phylum: Arthropoda
- Class: Insecta
- Order: Diptera
- Family: Tachinidae
- Subfamily: Exoristinae
- Tribe: Goniini
- Genus: Pterotopeza; Townsend, 1908

Type species
- Blepharipeza tarsalis Schiner, 1868

Synonyms
- Chaetoprocta Brauer & von Berganstamm, 1891; Jaenimyia Townsend, 1912; Pteropeza Guimarães, 1971

Genus of flies

Pterotopeza is a genus of flies in the family Tachinidae.

== Species ==
- Pterotopeza albicincta (Townsend, 1912)
- Pterotopeza punctata (Townsend, 1912)
- Pterotopeza tarsalis (Schiner, 1868)
