= Trupanea orfila =

Scientific classification
- Kingdom: Animalia
- Phylum: Arthropoda
- Clade: Pancrustacea
- Class: Insecta
- Order: Diptera
- Family: Tephritidae
- Subfamily: Tephritinae
- Tribe: Tephritini
- Genus: Trupanea
- Species: T. orfila

Binomial name
- Trupanea orfila Hering, 1940

Synonyms
- Trypanea orfila Hering, 1940

Species of fly

Trupanea orfila is a species of fruit fly in the genus Plaumannimyia of the family Tephritidae.

== Distribution ==
Ethiopia.
