= Trupanea digrammata =

Scientific classification
- Kingdom: Animalia
- Phylum: Arthropoda
- Clade: Pancrustacea
- Class: Insecta
- Order: Diptera
- Family: Tephritidae
- Subfamily: Tephritinae
- Tribe: Tephritini
- Genus: Trupanea
- Species: T. digrammata

Binomial name
- Trupanea digrammata (Hering, 1947)

Synonyms
- Trypanea digrammata Hering, 1947; Trypanea diagrammata Aczél, 1950

Species of fly

Trupanea digrammata is a species of tephritid or fruit flies in the genus Trupanea of the family Tephritidae.

== Distribution ==
Mexico.
