= Pseudodinera nigripes =

Scientific classification
- Kingdom: Animalia
- Phylum: Arthropoda
- Class: Insecta
- Order: Diptera
- Family: Tachinidae
- Subfamily: Dexiinae
- Tribe: Dexiini
- Genus: Pseudodinera
- Species: P. nigripes

Binomial name
- Pseudodinera nigripes Brauer & von Berganstamm, 1891

Species of fly

Pseudodinera nigripes is a species of fly in the family Tachinidae.

== Distribution ==
South Africa.
