= Trupanea repleta =

Scientific classification
- Kingdom: Animalia
- Phylum: Arthropoda
- Clade: Pancrustacea
- Class: Insecta
- Order: Diptera
- Family: Tephritidae
- Subfamily: Tephritinae
- Tribe: Tephritini
- Genus: Trupanea
- Species: T. repleta

Binomial name
- Trupanea repleta (Bezzi, 1918)

Synonyms
- Trypanea aucta var. repleta Bezzi, 1918

Species of fly

Trupanea repleta is a species of tephritid or fruit flies in the genus Trupanea of the family Tephritidae.

== Distribution ==
Cape Verde, Egypt, Eritrea.
