= Trupanea mevarna =

Scientific classification
- Kingdom: Animalia
- Phylum: Arthropoda
- Clade: Pancrustacea
- Class: Insecta
- Order: Diptera
- Family: Tephritidae
- Subfamily: Tephritinae
- Tribe: Tephritini
- Genus: Trupanea
- Species: T. mevarna

Binomial name
- Trupanea mevarna (Walker, 1849)

Synonyms
- Trypeta mevarna Walker, 1849; Trypeta solaris Loew, 1862; Urellia maverna Baker, 1904

Species of fly

Trupanea mevarna is a species of tephritid or fruit flies in the genus Trupanea of the family Tephritidae.

== Distribution ==
United States, Mexico, Puerto Rico.
