= Trupanea vicina =

Scientific classification
- Kingdom: Animalia
- Phylum: Arthropoda
- Clade: Pancrustacea
- Class: Insecta
- Order: Diptera
- Family: Tephritidae
- Subfamily: Tephritinae
- Tribe: Tephritini
- Genus: Trupanea
- Species: T. vicina

Binomial name
- Trupanea vicina (Wulp, 1900)

Synonyms
- Urellia vicina Wulp, 1900

Species of fly

Trupanea vicina is a species of tephritid or fruit flies in the genus Trupanea of the family Tephritidae.

== Distribution ==
United States & Guatemala.
