= Trupanea ornum =

Scientific classification
- Kingdom: Animalia
- Phylum: Arthropoda
- Clade: Pancrustacea
- Class: Insecta
- Order: Diptera
- Family: Tephritidae
- Subfamily: Tephritinae
- Tribe: Tephritini
- Genus: Trupanea
- Species: T. ornum

Binomial name
- Trupanea ornum Norrbom, 1999

Synonyms
- Trupanea mutabilis Munro, 1964; Trupanea mutabilis f. concisa Munro, 1964; Trupanea mutabilis f. opipara Munro, 1964

Species of fly

Trupanea ornum is a species of fruit fly in the genus Trupanea of the family Tephritidae.

== Distribution ==
Kenya.
