= Trupanea convergens =

Scientific classification
- Kingdom: Animalia
- Phylum: Arthropoda
- Clade: Pancrustacea
- Class: Insecta
- Order: Diptera
- Family: Tephritidae
- Subfamily: Tephritinae
- Tribe: Tephritini
- Genus: Trupanea
- Species: T. convergens

Binomial name
- Trupanea convergens (Hering, 1936)

Synonyms
- Trypanea convergens Hering, 1936; Trypanea sinensis Zia, 1937; Trupanea cosmina Hendel, 1938

Species of fly

Trupanea convergens is a species of tephritid or fruit flies in the genus Trupanea of the family Tephritidae.

== Distribution ==
Mongolia, Eastern Russia, China, Malaysia, Philippines.
