= Trupanea notata =

Scientific classification
- Kingdom: Animalia
- Phylum: Arthropoda
- Clade: Pancrustacea
- Class: Insecta
- Order: Diptera
- Family: Tephritidae
- Subfamily: Tephritinae
- Tribe: Tephritini
- Genus: Trupanea
- Species: T. notata

Binomial name
- Trupanea notata Hardy & Drew, 1996

Species of fly

Trupanea notata is a species of tephritid or fruit flies in the genus Trupanea of the family Tephritidae. Trumpanea notata is an identified species admitted to the taxonomy of the dipteran family of Tephritidae through the works of Hardy and Drew (1996) during the classification and identification of Australia's Tephritinae genus-groups.

== Distribution ==
Australia.
