= Trupanea tersa =

Scientific classification
- Kingdom: Animalia
- Phylum: Arthropoda
- Clade: Pancrustacea
- Class: Insecta
- Order: Diptera
- Family: Tephritidae
- Subfamily: Tephritinae
- Tribe: Tephritini
- Genus: Trupanea
- Species: T. tersa

Binomial name
- Trupanea tersa Munro, 1964

Species of fly

Trupanea tersa is a species of tephritid or fruit flies in the genus Trupanea of the family Tephritidae.

== Distribution ==
Zimbabwe.
