= Trupanea vernoniae =

Scientific classification
- Kingdom: Animalia
- Phylum: Arthropoda
- Clade: Pancrustacea
- Class: Insecta
- Order: Diptera
- Family: Tephritidae
- Subfamily: Tephritinae
- Tribe: Tephritini
- Genus: Trupanea
- Species: T. vernoniae

Binomial name
- Trupanea vernoniae Hardy, 1973

Species of fly

Trupanea vernoniae is a species of fruit fly in the family Tephritidae. It measures 4.7 mm (0.19 in) in body length.

== Distribution ==
The species is known from Thailand.
