= Trupanea propinqua =

Scientific classification
- Kingdom: Animalia
- Phylum: Arthropoda
- Clade: Pancrustacea
- Class: Insecta
- Order: Diptera
- Family: Tephritidae
- Subfamily: Tephritinae
- Tribe: Tephritini
- Genus: Trupanea
- Species: T. propinqua

Binomial name
- Trupanea propinqua (Hering, 1941)

Synonyms
- Trypanea propinqua Hering, 1941

Species of fly

Trupanea propinqua is a species of tephritid or fruit flies in the genus Trupanea of the family Tephritidae. The species can be found in Peru.
