= Trupanea aucta =

Scientific classification
- Kingdom: Animalia
- Phylum: Arthropoda
- Clade: Pancrustacea
- Class: Insecta
- Order: Diptera
- Family: Tephritidae
- Subfamily: Tephritinae
- Tribe: Tephritini
- Genus: Trupanea
- Species: T. aucta

Binomial name
- Trupanea aucta Bezzi, 1913

Species of fly

Trupanea aucta is a species of tephritid or fruit flies in the genus Pliomelaena of the family Tephritidae.

== Distribution ==
India, Sri Lanka.
