= Trupanea neodaphne =

Scientific classification
- Kingdom: Animalia
- Phylum: Arthropoda
- Clade: Pancrustacea
- Class: Insecta
- Order: Diptera
- Family: Tephritidae
- Subfamily: Tephritinae
- Tribe: Tephritini
- Genus: Trupanea
- Species: T. neodaphne

Binomial name
- Trupanea neodaphne (Malloch, 1933)

Synonyms
- Trypanea neodaphne Malloch, 1933; Trypanea neodaphne var. beta Malloch, 1933; Trypanea neodaphne var. gamma Malloch, 1933

Species of fly

Trupanea neodaphne is a species of tephritid or fruit flies in the genus Trupanea of the family Tephritidae.

== Distribution ==
Paraguay, Uruguay.
