= Plaumannimyia eugenia =

Scientific classification
- Kingdom: Animalia
- Phylum: Arthropoda
- Class: Insecta
- Order: Diptera
- Family: Tephritidae
- Subfamily: Tephritinae
- Tribe: Tephritini
- Genus: Plaumannimyia
- Species: P. eugenia

Binomial name
- Plaumannimyia eugenia (Wulp, 1900)

Synonyms
- Urellia eugenia Wulp, 1900)

Species of fly

Plaumannimyia eugenia is a species of fruit fly in the genus Plaumannimyia of the family Tephritidae.

== Distribution ==
Mexico, Guatemala.
