= Trupanea dacetoptera =

Scientific classification
- Kingdom: Animalia
- Phylum: Arthropoda
- Clade: Pancrustacea
- Class: Insecta
- Order: Diptera
- Family: Tephritidae
- Subfamily: Tephritinae
- Tribe: Tephritini
- Genus: Trupanea
- Species: T. dacetoptera

Binomial name
- Trupanea dacetoptera (Phillips, 1923)

Synonyms
- Trypanea dacetoptera Phillips, 1923

Species of fly

Trupanea dacetoptera is a species of tephritid or fruit flies in the genus Trupanea of the family Tephritidae.

== Distribution ==
Canada, United States, Bahamas, Puerto Rico, Saint Croix.
