= Trupanea lyneborgi =

Scientific classification
- Kingdom: Animalia
- Phylum: Arthropoda
- Clade: Pancrustacea
- Class: Insecta
- Order: Diptera
- Family: Tephritidae
- Subfamily: Tephritinae
- Tribe: Tephritini
- Genus: Trupanea
- Species: T. lyneborgi

Binomial name
- Trupanea lyneborgi Hardy, 1970

Species of fly

Trupanea lyneborgi is a species of fruit fly in the genus Trupanea of the family Tephritidae.

== Distribution ==
New Ireland.
