= Trupanea diluta =

Scientific classification
- Kingdom: Animalia
- Phylum: Arthropoda
- Clade: Pancrustacea
- Class: Insecta
- Order: Diptera
- Family: Tephritidae
- Subfamily: Tephritinae
- Tribe: Tephritini
- Genus: Trupanea
- Species: T. diluta

Binomial name
- Trupanea diluta (Enderlein, 1911)

Synonyms
- Urellia diluta Enderlein, 1911

Species of fly

Trupanea diluta is a species of tephritid or fruit flies in the genus Trupanea of the family Tephritidae.

== Distribution ==
Argentina.
