= Trupanea cratericola =

Scientific classification
- Kingdom: Animalia
- Phylum: Arthropoda
- Clade: Pancrustacea
- Class: Insecta
- Order: Diptera
- Family: Tephritidae
- Subfamily: Tephritinae
- Tribe: Tephritini
- Genus: Trupanea
- Species: T. cratericola

Binomial name
- Trupanea cratericola Grimshaw, 1901

Synonyms
- Tephritis cratericola Grimshaw, 1901

Species of fly

Trupanea cratericola is a species of tephritid or fruit flies in the genus Trupanea of the family Tephritidae.

== Distribution ==
Hawaiian Islands.
