= Trupanea sandoana =

Scientific classification
- Kingdom: Animalia
- Phylum: Arthropoda
- Clade: Pancrustacea
- Class: Insecta
- Order: Diptera
- Family: Tephritidae
- Subfamily: Tephritinae
- Tribe: Tephritini
- Genus: Trupanea
- Species: T. sandoana

Binomial name
- Trupanea sandoana Hering, 1938

Synonyms
- Trypanea sandoana Hering, 1938

Species of fly

Trupanea sandoana is a species of fruit fly in the genus Trupanea of the family Tephritidae.

== Distribution ==
Congo, Tanzania.
