= Trupanea brunneipennis =

Scientific classification
- Kingdom: Animalia
- Phylum: Arthropoda
- Clade: Pancrustacea
- Class: Insecta
- Order: Diptera
- Family: Tephritidae
- Subfamily: Tephritinae
- Tribe: Tephritini
- Genus: Trupanea
- Species: T. brunneipennis

Binomial name
- Trupanea brunneipennis Hardy, 1973

Species of fly

Trupanea brunneipennis is a species of fruit fly in the family Tephritidae. It measures 4.6–4.8 mm (0.18–0.19 in) in body length.

== Distribution ==
The species is known from Thailand.
