= Trupanea conjuncta =

Scientific classification
- Kingdom: Animalia
- Phylum: Arthropoda
- Clade: Pancrustacea
- Class: Insecta
- Order: Diptera
- Family: Tephritidae
- Subfamily: Tephritinae
- Tribe: Tephritini
- Genus: Trupanea
- Species: T. conjuncta

Binomial name
- Trupanea conjuncta (Adams, 1904)

Synonyms
- Urellia conjuncta Adams, 1904

Species of fly

Trupanea conjuncta is a species of tephritid or fruit flies in the genus Trupanea of the family Tephritidae.

== Distribution ==
Mexico & United States.
