= Trupanea austera =

Scientific classification
- Kingdom: Animalia
- Phylum: Arthropoda
- Clade: Pancrustacea
- Class: Insecta
- Order: Diptera
- Family: Tephritidae
- Subfamily: Tephritinae
- Tribe: Tephritini
- Genus: Trupanea
- Species: T. austera

Binomial name
- Trupanea austera (Hering, 1942)

Synonyms
- Trypanea austera Hering, 1942

Species of fly

Trupanea austera is a species of tephritid or fruit flies in the genus Pliomelaena of the family Tephritidae.

== Distribution ==
Chile.
