= Trupanea rufa =

Scientific classification
- Kingdom: Animalia
- Phylum: Arthropoda
- Clade: Pancrustacea
- Class: Insecta
- Order: Diptera
- Family: Tephritidae
- Subfamily: Tephritinae
- Tribe: Tephritini
- Genus: Trupanea
- Species: T. rufa

Binomial name
- Trupanea rufa Hardy, 1988

Species of fly

Trupanea rufa is a species of tephritid or fruit flies in the genus Trupanea of the family Tephritidae.

== Distribution ==
New Guinea.
