= Trupanea bonariensis =

Scientific classification
- Kingdom: Animalia
- Phylum: Arthropoda
- Clade: Pancrustacea
- Class: Insecta
- Order: Diptera
- Family: Tephritidae
- Subfamily: Tephritinae
- Tribe: Tephritini
- Genus: Trupanea
- Species: T. bonariensis

Binomial name
- Trupanea bonariensis (Brèthes, 1908)

Synonyms
- Urellia bonariensis Brèthes, 1908; Trypanea majuscula Bezzi & Tavares, 1916; Trypanea ornatissima Hering, 1935

Species of fly

Trupanea bonariensis is a species of tephritid or fruit flies in the genus Trupanea of the family Tephritidae.

== Distribution ==
Bolivia, Paraguay, Argentina, South Brazil.
