= Trupanea nymphula =

Scientific classification
- Kingdom: Animalia
- Phylum: Arthropoda
- Clade: Pancrustacea
- Class: Insecta
- Order: Diptera
- Family: Tephritidae
- Subfamily: Tephritinae
- Tribe: Tephritini
- Genus: Trupanea
- Species: T. nymphula

Binomial name
- Trupanea nymphula Blanchard, 1854

Synonyms
- Acinia nymphula Blanchard, 1854

Species of fly

Trupanea nymphula is a species of tephritid or fruit flies in the genus Trupanea of the family Tephritidae.

== Distribution ==
Chile.
