= Trupanea superdecora =

Scientific classification
- Kingdom: Animalia
- Phylum: Arthropoda
- Clade: Pancrustacea
- Class: Insecta
- Order: Diptera
- Family: Tephritidae
- Subfamily: Tephritinae
- Tribe: Tephritini
- Genus: Trupanea
- Species: T. superdecora

Binomial name
- Trupanea superdecora (Bezzi, 1924)

Synonyms
- Trypanea superdecora Bezzi, 1924

Species of fly

Trupanea superdecora is a species of tephritid or fruit flies in the genus Trupanea of the family Tephritidae.

== Distribution ==
Congo, Uganda & Kenya to Namibia, Reunion, Mauritius, South Africa.
