= Trupanea guttistella =

Scientific classification
- Kingdom: Animalia
- Phylum: Arthropoda
- Clade: Pancrustacea
- Class: Insecta
- Order: Diptera
- Family: Tephritidae
- Subfamily: Tephritinae
- Tribe: Tephritini
- Genus: Trupanea
- Species: T. guttistella

Binomial name
- Trupanea guttistella (Hering, 1951)

Synonyms
- Trypanea guttistella Hering, 1951; Trupanea collina Ito, 1984

Species of fly

Trupanea guttistella is a species of tephritid or fruit flies in the genus Trupanea of the family Tephritidae.

== Distribution ==
Russia, China, Japan.
