= Trupanea obsoleta =

Scientific classification
- Kingdom: Animalia
- Phylum: Arthropoda
- Clade: Pancrustacea
- Class: Insecta
- Order: Diptera
- Family: Tephritidae
- Subfamily: Tephritinae
- Tribe: Tephritini
- Genus: Trupanea
- Species: T. obsoleta

Binomial name
- Trupanea obsoleta (Hendel, 1914)

Synonyms
- Trypanea obsoleta Hendel, 1914

Species of fly

Trupanea obsoleta is a species of tephritid or fruit flies in the genus Trupanea of the family Tephritidae.

== Distribution ==
Chile.
