= Trupanea nudipes =

Scientific classification
- Kingdom: Animalia
- Phylum: Arthropoda
- Clade: Pancrustacea
- Class: Insecta
- Order: Diptera
- Family: Tephritidae
- Subfamily: Tephritinae
- Tribe: Tephritini
- Genus: Trupanea
- Species: T. nudipes

Binomial name
- Trupanea nudipes Hering, 1938

Synonyms
- Trypanea nudipes Hering, 1938

Species of fly

Trupanea nudipes is a species of fruit fly in the genus Trupanea of the family Tephritidae.

== Distribution ==
Brazil.
