= Trupanea aira =

Scientific classification
- Kingdom: Animalia
- Phylum: Arthropoda
- Clade: Pancrustacea
- Class: Insecta
- Order: Diptera
- Family: Tephritidae
- Subfamily: Tephritinae
- Tribe: Tephritini
- Genus: Trupanea
- Species: T. aira

Binomial name
- Trupanea aira (Walker, 1849)

Synonyms
- Trypeta aira Walker, 1849; Trypanea pseudodecora Hering, 1942

Species of fly

Trupanea aira is a species of tephritid or fruit flies in the genus Trupanea of the family Tephritidae.

== Distribution ==
Cameroon, Congo, Burundi, Tanzania.
