= Trupanea isolata =

Scientific classification
- Kingdom: Animalia
- Phylum: Arthropoda
- Clade: Pancrustacea
- Class: Insecta
- Order: Diptera
- Family: Tephritidae
- Subfamily: Tephritinae
- Tribe: Tephritini
- Genus: Trupanea
- Species: T. isolata

Binomial name
- Trupanea isolata Hardy, 1973

Species of fly

Trupanea isolata is a species of fruit flies in the family Tephritidae. It measures 3.5 mm (0.14 in) in body length. It was first described by Dilbert Elmo Hardy.

== Distribution ==
The species is known from Vietnam.
