= Trupanea phrycta =

Scientific classification
- Kingdom: Animalia
- Phylum: Arthropoda
- Clade: Pancrustacea
- Class: Insecta
- Order: Diptera
- Family: Tephritidae
- Subfamily: Tephritinae
- Tribe: Tephritini
- Genus: Trupanea
- Species: T. phrycta

Binomial name
- Trupanea phrycta (Hendel, 1914)

Synonyms
- Trypanea phrycta Hendel, 1914; Trupanea phrycte Foote, 1967

Species of fly

Trupanea phrycta is a species of tephritid or fruit flies in the genus Trupanea of the family Tephritidae.

== Distribution ==
It is found in Peru.
