= Plaumannimyia pallens =

Scientific classification
- Kingdom: Animalia
- Phylum: Arthropoda
- Class: Insecta
- Order: Diptera
- Family: Tephritidae
- Subfamily: Tephritinae
- Tribe: Tephritini
- Genus: Plaumannimyia
- Species: P. pallens

Binomial name
- Plaumannimyia pallens Hering, 1938

Species of fly

Plaumannimyia pallens is a species of fruit fly in the genus Plaumannimyia of the family Tephritidae.

== Distribution ==
Brazil.
