= Trupanea chariessa =

Scientific classification
- Kingdom: Animalia
- Phylum: Arthropoda
- Clade: Pancrustacea
- Class: Insecta
- Order: Diptera
- Family: Tephritidae
- Subfamily: Tephritinae
- Tribe: Tephritini
- Genus: Trupanea
- Species: T. chariessa

Binomial name
- Trupanea chariessa (Hendel, 1914)

Synonyms
- Trypanea chariessa Hendel, 1914; Trypanea chariesa Aczél, 1950

Species of fly

Trupanea chariessa is a species of tephritid or fruit flies in the genus Trupanea of the family Tephritidae.

== Distribution ==
Bolivia.
