= Trupanea pseudodaphne =

Scientific classification
- Kingdom: Animalia
- Phylum: Arthropoda
- Clade: Pancrustacea
- Class: Insecta
- Order: Diptera
- Family: Tephritidae
- Subfamily: Tephritinae
- Tribe: Tephritini
- Genus: Trupanea
- Species: T. pseudodaphne

Binomial name
- Trupanea pseudodaphne (Hering, 1942)

Species of fly

Trupanea pseudodaphne is a species of tephritid or fruit flies in the genus Tephritomyia of the family Tephritidae.

== Distribution ==
Argentina, Brazil.
