= Trupanea nigriseta =

Scientific classification
- Kingdom: Animalia
- Phylum: Arthropoda
- Clade: Pancrustacea
- Class: Insecta
- Order: Diptera
- Family: Tephritidae
- Subfamily: Tephritinae
- Tribe: Tephritini
- Genus: Trupanea
- Species: T. nigriseta

Binomial name
- Trupanea nigriseta (Malloch, 1933)

Synonyms
- Trypanea nigriseta Malloch, 1933

Species of fly

Trupanea nigriseta is a species of tephritid or fruit flies in the genus Trupanea of the family Tephritidae. The species is Native to South America, mainly Chile and Argentina.

== Distribution ==
Chile, Argentina.
