= Trupanea eclipta =

Scientific classification
- Kingdom: Animalia
- Phylum: Arthropoda
- Clade: Pancrustacea
- Class: Insecta
- Order: Diptera
- Family: Tephritidae
- Subfamily: Tephritinae
- Tribe: Tephritini
- Genus: Trupanea
- Species: T. eclipta

Binomial name
- Trupanea eclipta Benjamin, 1934

Synonyms
- Trypanea eclipta Benjamin, 1934

Species of fly

Trupanea eclipta is a species of tephritid or fruit flies in the genus Trupanea of the family Tephritidae.

== Distribution ==
United States, Mexico, Belize, Guatemala, Greater & Lesser Antilles.
