= Autalia =

Scientific classification
- Domain: Eukaryota
- Kingdom: Animalia
- Phylum: Arthropoda
- Class: Insecta
- Order: Coleoptera
- Suborder: Polyphaga
- Infraorder: Staphyliniformia
- Family: Staphylinidae
- Subfamily: Aleocharinae
- Tribe: Autaliini
- Genus: Autalia; Leach, 1819

Genus of beetles

Autalia is a genus of beetles belonging to the family Staphylinidae.

The genus was first described by Leach in 1819.

The species of this genus are found in Europe and Northern America.

Species:

- Autalia impressa
- Autalia longicornis
- Autalia puncticollis
- Autalia rivularis
