= Plaumannimyia =

Scientific classification
- Kingdom: Animalia
- Phylum: Arthropoda
- Class: Insecta
- Order: Diptera
- Family: Tephritidae
- Subfamily: Tephritinae
- Tribe: Tephritini
- Genus: Plaumannimyia; Hering, 1938

Type species
- Plaumannimyia pallens Hering, 1938

Genus of flies

Plaumannimyia is a genus of tephritid or fruit flies in the family Tephritidae.

== Species ==
- Plaumannimyia costaemaculata Hering, 1940
- Plaumannimyia eugenia (Wulp, 1900)
- Plaumannimyia pallens Hering, 1938

== Distribution ==
Mexico, Guatemala, Brazil.
