= Ignaz Rudolph Schiner =

Austrian entomologist

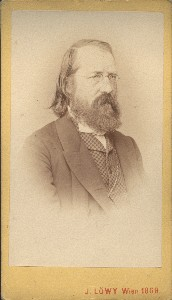
Ignaz Rudolph Schiner

Ignaz Rudolf Schiner (April 17, 1813 – July 6, 1873) was an Austrian entomologist who specialised in Diptera.

Schiner was born in Fronsburg, Horn and died in Vienna. He was a ministerial secretary in Vienna

His most significant publications are:

- Fauna Austriaca. Die Fliegen (Diptera). Nach der analytischen Methode bearbeitet 1862–1864.
- As editor Catalogus systematicus dipterorum Europae. W.M.W. Impensis: Societatis Zoologico-Botanicae 1864.

Schiner's collections are in the Naturhistorisches Museum in Vienna.
