= Carl Gustaf Thomson =

Swedish entomologist

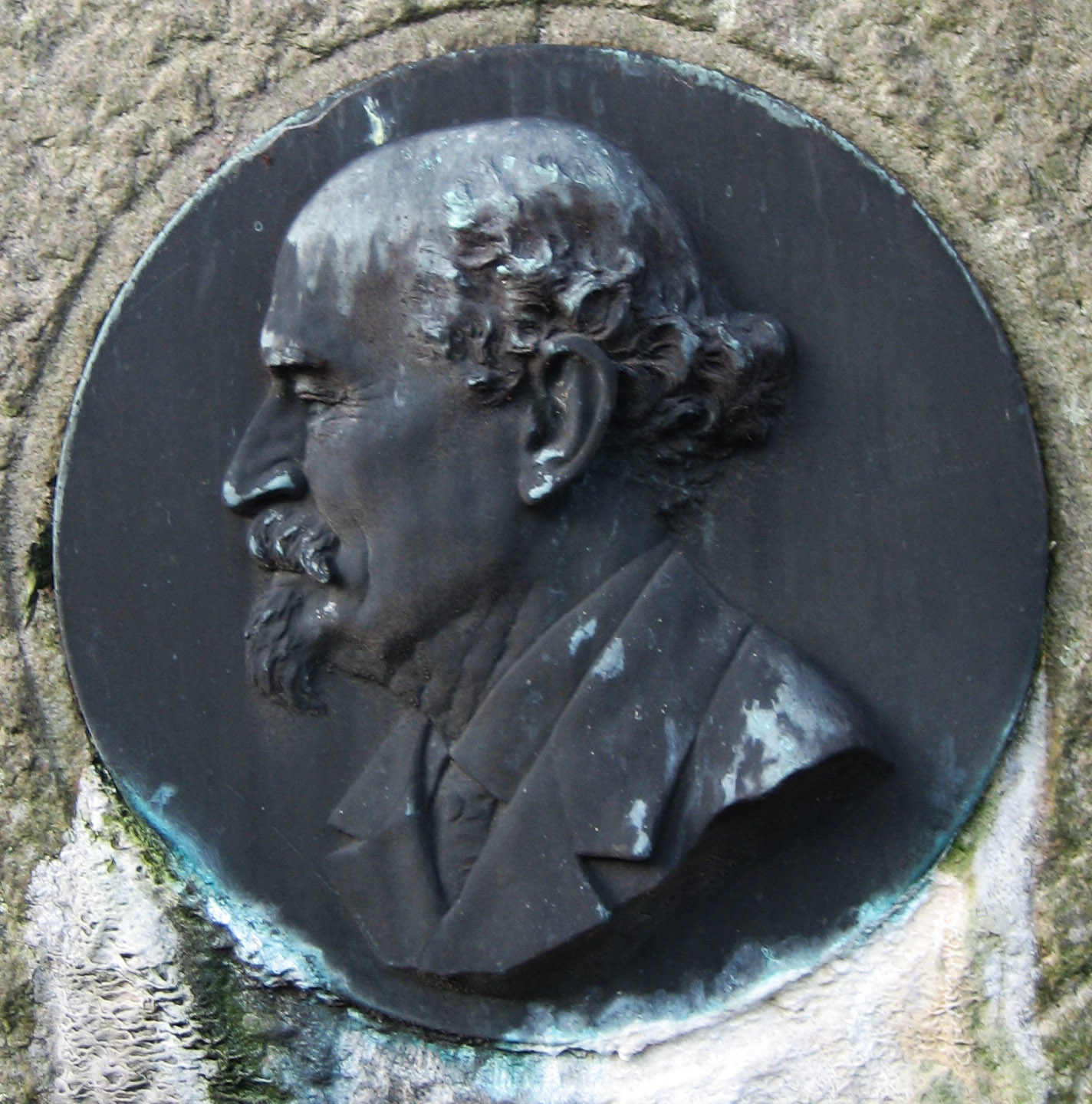
Carl Gustaf Thomson

Carl Gustaf Thomson (13 October 1824, in Malmöhus – 20 September 1899, in Lund) was a Swedish entomologist.

Thomson became a student at the University of Lund in 1843, graduated in 1850 and became associate professor of zoology there in 1857. In 1862 he became the curator of the entomological department of the Zoological Museum and in 1864 became a lecturer in entomology as well. An 1872 scholarship enabled him to travel to the continent for scientific study. He was offered the post of Director of the Entomological Museum in Berlin, but he declined.

Carl Gustaf Thomson was the author of Coleoptera Scandinaviae (ten volumes, 1859–68), Skandinaviens inseckta (1862), Scandinavia Hymenoptera (five volumes, 1871–79) and Opuscula Entomologica (22 bands, 1869–97). Publication ceased in 1897 due to problems with his eyesight. He also published descriptions of the insects collected on the voyage of the Fregatten Eugenies (HSwMS Eugenie), the first Swedish vessel to circumnavigate the world, especially in Diptera, species novas, etc. (1858).
