= List of Pipunculidae species of Great Britain =

List of British species of the fly family Pipunculidae

This list is based on the world catalogue by De Meyer (1996), with revision of British species by Chandler (1998)

- Subfamily Chalarinae

- Genus Chalarus Walker, 1834

- C. argenteus Coe, 1966
- C. basalis Loew, 1873
- C. brevicaudis Jervis, 1992
- C. clarus Jervis, 1992
- C. decorus Jervis, 1992
- C. elegantulus Jervis, 1992
- C. exiguus (Haliday, 1833)
- C. fimbriatus Coe, 1966
- C. griseus Coe, 1966
- C. gynocephalus Jervis, 1992
- C. holosericeus (Meigen, 1824)
- C. immanis Kehlmaier in Kehlmaier & Assmann, 2008
- C. indistinctus Jervis, 1992
- C. juliae Jervis, 1992
- C. latifrons Hardy, 1943
- C. longicaudis Jervis, 1992
- C. marki Kehlmaier & Assmann, 2008
- C. proprius Jervis, 1992
- C. pughi Coe, 1966
- C. spurius (Fallén, 1816)

- Genus Jassidophaga Aczél, 1939

- J. beatricis (Coe, 1966)
- J. fasciata (von Roser, 1840)
- J. pilosa (Zetterstedt, [1838])
- J. villosa (von Roser, 1840)

- Genus Verrallia Mik, 1899

- V. aucta (Fallén, 1817)

- Subfamily Nephrocerinae

- Genus Nephrocerus Zetterstedt, 1838

- N. flavicornis Zetterstedt, 1844
- N. scutellatus (Macquart, 1834)

- Subfamily Pipunculinae

- Tribe Cephalopsini

- Genus Cephalops Fallén, 1810

- Sub Genus Beckerias Aczél, 1939

- C. pannonicus (Aczél, 1939)

- Sub Genus Cephalops Fallén, 1810

- C. aeneus Fallén, 1810
- C. vittipes (Zetterstedt, 1844)

- Sub Genus Parabeckerias De Meyer, 1994

- C. obtusinervis (Zetterstedt, 1844)

- Sub Genus Semicephalops De Meyer, 1994

- C. carinatus (Verrall, 1901)
- C. penultimus Ackland, 1993
- C. perspicuus (Meijere, 1907)
- C. signatus (Becker, 1900)
- C. straminipes (Becker, 1900)
- C. subultimus Collin, 1956
- C. ultimus (Becker, 1900)
- C. varipes (Meigen, 1824)

- Genus Cephalosphaera Enderlein, 1936

- C. furcata (Egger, 1860)
- C. germanica Aczél, 1940

- Tribe Eudorylini

- Genus Claraeola Aczél, 1940

- C. halterata (Meigen, 1838)
- C. melanostola (Becker, 1898)

- Genus Clistoabdominalis Skevington, 2001

- C. ruralis (Meigen, 1824)

- Genus Dasydorylas Skevington & Yeates, 2001

- D. horridus (Becker, 1898)

- Genus Eudorylas Aczél, 1940

- E. arcanus Coe, 1966
- E. auctus Kehlmaier, 2005
- E. caledonicus Ackland, 1999
- E. coloratus (Becker, 1897)
- E. fuscipes (Zetterstedt, 1844)
- E. fusculus (Zetterstedt, 1844)
- E. inferus Collin, 1956
- E. jenkinsoni Coe, 1966
- E. kowarzi (Becker, 1898)
- E. longifrons Coe, 1966
- E. montium (Becker, 1898)
- E. obliquus Coe, 1966
- E. obscurus Coe, 1966
- E. restrictus Coe, 1966
- E. subfascipes Collin, 1956
- E. subterminalis Collin, 1956
- E. terminalis (Thomson, 1870)
- E. unicolor (Zetterstedt, 1844)
- E. zermattensis (Becker, 1898)
- E. zonatus (Zetterstedt, 1849)
- E. zonellus Collin, 1956

- Tribe Microcephalopsini

- Genus Microcephalops De Meyer, 1989

- M. opacus (Fallén, 1816)

- Tribe Pipunculini

- Genus Pipunculus Latreille, 1802

- P. campestris Latreille, 1802
- P. elegans Egger, 1860
- P. fonsecai Coe, 1966
- P. lenis Kuznetzov, 1991
- P. lichtwardti Kozánek, 1981
- P. oldenbergi Collin, 1956
- P. omissinervis Becker, 1889
- P. tenuirostris Kozánek, 1981
- P. violovitshi Kuznetzov, 1991
- P. zugmayeriae Kowarz, 1887

- Tribe Tomosvaryellini

- Genus Dorylomorpha Aczél, 1939

- Subgenus Dorylomorpha Aczél, 1939

- D. confusa (Verrall, 1901)
- D. extricata (Collin, 1937)
- D. imparata (Collin, 1937)
- D. rufipes (Meigen, 1824)

- Subgenus Dorylomyia Albrecht, 1990

- D. beckeri (Aczél, 1939)

- Subgenus Dorylomyza Albrecht, 1990

- D. albitarsis (Zetterstedt, 1844)
- D. anderssoni Albrecht, 1979
- D. clavifemora Coe, 1966
- D. fennica Albrecht, 1979
- D. haemorrhoidalis (Zetterstedt, [1838])
- D. hungarica (Aczél, 1939)
- D. infirmata (Collin, 1937)
- D. occidens (Hardy, 1939)
- D. xanthopus (Thomson, 1870)

- Subgenus Pipunculina Albrecht, 1990

- D. maculata (Walker, 1834)

- Genus Tomosvaryella Aczél, 1939

- T. cilitarsis (Strobl, 1910)
- T. geniculata (Meigen, 1824)
- T. kuthyi Aczél, 1944
- T. littoralis (Becker, 1898)
- T. minima (Becker, 1898)
- T. palliditarsis (Collin, 1931)
- T. sylvatica (Meigen, 1824)
