= List of Tomosvaryella species =

This is a list of 282 species in Tomosvaryella, a genus of big-headed flies in the family Pipunculidae.

== Tomosvaryella species ==
- Tomosvaryella aegyptia Kuznetzov, 1994
- Tomosvaryella aeneiventris (Kertész, 1903)
- Tomosvaryella africana Hardy, 1949
- Tomosvaryella agnesea Hardy, 1940
- Tomosvaryella albiseta Cresson, 1911
- Tomosvaryella aliena Hardy, 1947
- Tomosvaryella amazonensis De Meyer & Skevington, 2000
- Tomosvaryella ancylostyla Hardy, 1961
- Tomosvaryella angolensis De Meyer, 1993
- Tomosvaryella angulata Kehlmaier & Majnon-Jahromi, 2017
- Tomosvaryella anomala Hardy, 1949
- Tomosvaryella apicalis Hardy, 1949
- Tomosvaryella appendipes (Cresson, 1911)
- Tomosvaryella argentea (Sack, 1935)
- Tomosvaryella argenteiventris Kuznetzov, 1994
- Tomosvaryella argentifrons Kuznetzov, 1994
- Tomosvaryella argentosa Kuznetzov, 1994
- Tomosvaryella arguta Kuznetzov, 1994
- Tomosvaryella argyrata De Meyer, 1995
- Tomosvaryella argyratoides De Meyer, 1995
- Tomosvaryella armata Hardy, 1940
- Tomosvaryella aurata Ale-Rocha, 1996
- Tomosvaryella baderiensis Kapoor, Grewal & Sharma, 1987
- Tomosvaryella basalis Hardy, 1950
- Tomosvaryella beameri Hardy, 1940
- Tomosvaryella bidens (Cresson, 1911)
- Tomosvaryella bissulca Ale-Rocha, 1996
- Tomosvaryella botswanae De Meyer, 1993
- Tomosvaryella brachybasis De Meyer, 1993
- Tomosvaryella brachyscolops Hardy, 1961
- Tomosvaryella brevidens Kuznetzov, 1994
- Tomosvaryella brevijuncta Hardy, 1943
- Tomosvaryella bugalensis Kuznetzov, 1994
- Tomosvaryella bulganensis Kuznetzov, 1994
- Tomosvaryella caerulescens De Meyer, 1993
- Tomosvaryella cagiae Skevington & Foldvari, 2007
- Tomosvaryella calcarata Hardy, 1968
- Tomosvaryella caligata Hardy, 1968
- Tomosvaryella chilensis Ale-Rocha, 1996
- Tomosvaryella cilifemorata (Becker, 1907)
- Tomosvaryella cilifera Kuznetzov, 1994
- Tomosvaryella cilitarsis (Strobl, 1910)
- Tomosvaryella claripennis (Loew, 1858)
- Tomosvaryella columbiana (Kertész, 1915)
- Tomosvaryella comaousa De Meyer, 1990
- Tomosvaryella concavifronta Yang & Xu, 1998
- Tomosvaryella congoana Hardy, 1950
- Tomosvaryella contorta (Hardy, 1939)
- Tomosvaryella coquilletti (Kertész, 1907)
- Tomosvaryella coquilletticoquilletti (Kertész, 1907)
- Tomosvaryella cornuta Kuznetzov, 1994
- Tomosvaryella corusca Skevington & Foldvari, 2007
- Tomosvaryella crassa Ale-Rocha, 2004
- Tomosvaryella crassifemorata De Meyer, 1993
- Tomosvaryella crinita Ale-Rocha, 1996
- Tomosvaryella curta Ale-Rocha, 1996
- Tomosvaryella curtissima Kuznetzov, 1993
- Tomosvaryella curvipatis Kapoor, Grewal & Sharma, 1987
- Tomosvaryella debruyni De Meyer, 1995
- Tomosvaryella deformis Hardy, 1947
- Tomosvaryella dehraduniensis Kapoor, Grewal & Sharma, 1987
- Tomosvaryella denticulatus Kapoor, Grewal & Sharma, 1987
- Tomosvaryella dentiterebra Collin, 1949
- Tomosvaryella deserticola Kuznetzov, 1993
- Tomosvaryella diffusa Ale-Rocha, 1996
- Tomosvaryella disjuncta (Becker, 1900)
- Tomosvaryella dissimilis Hardy, 1943
- Tomosvaryella dividua Kuznetzov, 1994
- Tomosvaryella docta De Meyer, 1995
- Tomosvaryella dongyue Yang & Xu, 1998
- Tomosvaryella ekyphysis Ale-Rocha, 1996
- Tomosvaryella epichalca (Perkins, 1905)
- Tomosvaryella equistylis Kapoor, Grewal & Sharma, 1987
- Tomosvaryella eusylvatica Kapoor, Grewal & Sharma, 1987
- Tomosvaryella exilidens Hardy, 1943
- Tomosvaryella falkovitshi Kuznetzov, 1993
- Tomosvaryella femella Kuznetzov, 1993
- Tomosvaryella flaviantenna (Hardy and Knowlton, 1939)
- Tomosvaryella flavicrus Hardy, 1968
- Tomosvaryella flavipes De Meyer, 1993
- Tomosvaryella flexa Kuznetzov, 1994
- Tomosvaryella floridensis Hardy, 1940
- Tomosvaryella forchhammeri De Meyer, 1993
- Tomosvaryella forter Yang & Xu, 1998
- Tomosvaryella freidbergi De Meyer, 1995
- Tomosvaryella frontata (Becker, 1898)
- Tomosvaryella galapagensis (Curran, 1934)
- Tomosvaryella gazliensis Kuznetzov, 1994
- Tomosvaryella geniculata (Meigen, 1824)
- Tomosvaryella genitalis Kapoor, Grewal & Sharma, 1987
- Tomosvaryella gibbosa Hardy, 1949
- Tomosvaryella gobiensis De Meyer & Skevington, 2000
- Tomosvaryella gussakovskyi Kuznetzov, 1994
- Tomosvaryella guwahatiensis Kapoor, Grewal & Sharma, 1987
- Tomosvaryella hactena Hardy, 1972
- Tomosvaryella helwanensis Collin, 1949
- Tomosvaryella hildeae De Meyer, 1997
- Tomosvaryella hirticollis (Becker, 1910)
- Tomosvaryella hispanica De Meyer, 1997
- Tomosvaryella hissarica Kuznetzov, 1993
- Tomosvaryella hongorica Kuznetzov, 1994
- Tomosvaryella hortobagyiensis Foldvari & De Meyer, 2000
- Tomosvaryella hozretishiensis Kuznetzov, 1994
- Tomosvaryella immutata (Becker, 1913)
- Tomosvaryella inazumae (Koizumi, 1960)
- Tomosvaryella incompta Ale-Rocha, 1996
- Tomosvaryella incondita Hardy, 1961
- Tomosvaryella inconspicus (Malloch, 1912)
- Tomosvaryella indica Kapoor, Grewal & Sharma, 1987
- Tomosvaryella inermis De Meyer, 1995
- Tomosvaryella inopinata De Meyer, 1995
- Tomosvaryella insulicola De Meyer, 1993
- Tomosvaryella israelensis De Meyer, 1995
- Tomosvaryella itoi (Koizumi, 1960)
- Tomosvaryella jubata De Meyer, 1995
- Tomosvaryella kalevala Kehlmaier, 2008
- Tomosvaryella karakalaensis Kuznetzov, 1994
- Tomosvaryella kashipurensis Kapoor, Grewal & Sharma, 1987
- Tomosvaryella kirghizorum Kuznetzov, 1993
- Tomosvaryella kondarensis Kuznetzov, 1993
- Tomosvaryella kuthyi Aczél, 1944
- Tomosvaryella lata Kuznetzov, 1994
- Tomosvaryella laticlavia Kuznetzov, 1994
- Tomosvaryella latitarsis Hardy, 1950
- Tomosvaryella leimonias (Perkins, 1905)
- Tomosvaryella lepidipes Hardy, 1943
- Tomosvaryella leri Kuznetzov, 1994
- Tomosvaryella limpidipennis (Brunetti, 1912)
- Tomosvaryella littoralis (Becker, 1898)
- Tomosvaryella longipygianus Kapoor, Grewal & Sharma, 1987
- Tomosvaryella longiseta Ale-Rocha, 1996
- Tomosvaryella longistylus Kapoor, Grewal & Sharma, 1987
- Tomosvaryella longula Kuznetzov, 1994
- Tomosvaryella luppovae Kuznetzov, 1994
- Tomosvaryella lynchi (Shannon, 1927)
- Tomosvaryella lyneborgi (Coe, 1969)
- Tomosvaryella manauensis Ale-Rocha, 1996
- Tomosvaryella mbuyensis Hardy, 1952
- Tomosvaryella mediocris (Collin, 1931)
- Tomosvaryella membranacea Ale-Rocha & Rafael, 1995
- Tomosvaryella membranosa Kuznetzov, 1994
- Tomosvaryella mesasiatica Kuznetzov, 1994
- Tomosvaryella mesostena Hardy, 1961
- Tomosvaryella mexicanensis Ale-Rocha & Rafael, 1995
- Tomosvaryella micronesiae Hardy, 1956
- Tomosvaryella mimica Kuznetzov, 1994
- Tomosvaryella minacis Hardy, 1940
- Tomosvaryella minima (Becker, 1898)
- Tomosvaryella minuscula (Collin, 1956)
- Tomosvaryella minutus Kapoor, Grewal & Sharma, 1987
- Tomosvaryella moala Skevington & Foldvari, 2007
- Tomosvaryella mongolica Kozanek, 1992
- Tomosvaryella montana De Meyer, 1993
- Tomosvaryella montina Kuznetzov, 1994
- Tomosvaryella multisetae Kapoor, Grewal & Sharma, 1987
- Tomosvaryella mutata (Becker, 1898)
- Tomosvaryella nalaihiana Kuznetzov, 1994
- Tomosvaryella nartshukae Kuznetzov, 1994
- Tomosvaryella nigra Kuznetzov, 1994
- Tomosvaryella nigritula Zetterstedt, 1844
- Tomosvaryella nigronitida (Collin, 1958)
- Tomosvaryella nitens Brunetti, 1912
- Tomosvaryella nodosa De Meyer, 1995
- Tomosvaryella novaezealandiae Tonnoir, 1925
- Tomosvaryella nyctias (Perkins, 1905)
- Tomosvaryella oligoseta De Meyer, 1993
- Tomosvaryella olmii De Meyer & Foldvari, 2008
- Tomosvaryella olympicola (Janssens, 1955)
- Tomosvaryella ornatitarsalis Hardy, 1954
- Tomosvaryella orthocladia Kuznetzov, 1994
- Tomosvaryella oryzaetora Koizumi, 1959
- Tomosvaryella palliditarsis (Collin, 1931)
- Tomosvaryella parakuthyi De Meyer, 1995
- Tomosvaryella parvicuspis Hardy, 1961
- Tomosvaryella pauca Hardy, 1943
- Tomosvaryella pectinalis Ale-Rocha, 1996
- Tomosvaryella pennatula Kuznetzov, 1994
- Tomosvaryella perissosceles Hardy, 1965
- Tomosvaryella pernitida (Becker, 1924)
- Tomosvaryella perpusilla (Collin, 1941)
- Tomosvaryella pilosiventris Becker, 1900
- Tomosvaryella pistacia Majnon-Jahromi & Kehlmaier, 2017
- Tomosvaryella platensis Ale-Rocha, 1996
- Tomosvaryella polita (Williston, 1896)
- Tomosvaryella propinqua (Becker, 1913)
- Tomosvaryella propria Hardy, 1949
- Tomosvaryella prostata Hardy, 1962
- Tomosvaryella pruinosa Kozanek, 1992
- Tomosvaryella pseudophanes (Perkins, 1905)
- Tomosvaryella pterae Kapoor & Grewal, 1985
- Tomosvaryella pulchra Kozanek, 1992
- Tomosvaryella pusilla De Meyer, 1995
- Tomosvaryella quadradentis Hardy, 1943
- Tomosvaryella ramnagariensis Kapoor, Grewal & Sharma, 1987
- Tomosvaryella relicta Kuznetzov, 1994
- Tomosvaryella resurgens De Meyer, 1997
- Tomosvaryella robusta Hardy, 1968
- Tomosvaryella rossica Kuznetzov, 1993
- Tomosvaryella ruwenzoriensis De Meyer, 1993
- Tomosvaryella sachtlebeni (Aczél, 1940)
- Tomosvaryella santaroi Ouchi, 1943
- Tomosvaryella santiagoensis De Meyer & Skevington, 2000
- Tomosvaryella scalprata Yang & Xu, 1987
- Tomosvaryella scopulata Hardy, 1962
- Tomosvaryella sedomensis De Meyer, 1995
- Tomosvaryella sentis Hardy, 1968
- Tomosvaryella sepulta De Meyer, 1997
- Tomosvaryella setositora Hardy, 1961
- Tomosvaryella shaoshanensis Yang & Xu, 1998
- Tomosvaryella sigillata Kuznetzov, 1994
- Tomosvaryella similis (Hough, 1899)
- Tomosvaryella singalensis (Kertész, 1903)
- Tomosvaryella singula Hardy, 1950
- Tomosvaryella singularis De Meyer, 1993
- Tomosvaryella singuloides De Meyer, 1993
- Tomosvaryella songinoensis Kuznetzov, 1994
- Tomosvaryella sonorensis (Cole, 1923)
- Tomosvaryella spangleri Scarbrough & Knutson, 1989
- Tomosvaryella speciosa Hardy, 1949
- Tomosvaryella spectata Kuznetzov, 1994
- Tomosvaryella spicata Kuznetzov, 1994
- Tomosvaryella spiculata Hardy, 1972
- Tomosvaryella spinea Kuznetzov, 1994
- Tomosvaryella spinigera De Meyer, 1993
- Tomosvaryella spinosa Ale-Rocha, 1996
- Tomosvaryella spinulenta Kuznetzov, 1994
- Tomosvaryella spinulifera Kuznetzov, 1994
- Tomosvaryella stackelbergi Kuznetzov, 1994
- Tomosvaryella subafricana De Meyer, 1993
- Tomosvaryella subhectena Kapoor, Grewal & Sharma, 1987
- Tomosvaryella subnitens (Cresson, 1911)
- Tomosvaryella subrobusta Kapoor, Grewal & Sharma, 1987
- Tomosvaryella subvirescens (Loew, 1872)
- Tomosvaryella sugonjaevi Kuznetzov, 1994
- Tomosvaryella sumbarensis Kuznetzov, 1993
- Tomosvaryella surstylae Kapoor, Grewal & Sharma, 1987
- Tomosvaryella sylvatica (Meigen, 1824)
- Tomosvaryella sylvaticoides (Lamb, 1922)
- Tomosvaryella sylvicola Kuznetzov, 1994
- Tomosvaryella synadelpha (Perkins, 1905)
- Tomosvaryella synadelphoides (Meijere, 1914)
- Tomosvaryella tadzhikorum Kuznetzov, 1994
- Tomosvaryella talyshensis Kuznetzov, 1994
- Tomosvaryella tanaitidis Kuznetzov, 1994
- Tomosvaryella tanasijtshuki Kuznetzov, 1994
- Tomosvaryella tattapaniensis Kapoor, Grewal & Sharma, 1987
- Tomosvaryella taurica Kuznetzov, 1994
- Tomosvaryella tecta De Meyer, 1993
- Tomosvaryella teligera Kuznetzov, 1994
- Tomosvaryella tenebricosa Kuznetzov, 1994
- Tomosvaryella tenera Kuznetzov, 1994
- Tomosvaryella teneroidea Kuznetzov, 1994
- Tomosvaryella tenuata Kuznetzov, 1994
- Tomosvaryella torosa Hardy, 1961
- Tomosvaryella toxodentis (Hardy and Knowlton, 1939)
- Tomosvaryella translata (Walker, 1857)
- Tomosvaryella transvaalensis De Meyer, 1993
- Tomosvaryella trichotibialis De Meyer, 1995
- Tomosvaryella tridens Hardy, 1950
- Tomosvaryella trigona Kuznetzov, 1994
- Tomosvaryella trjapitzini Kuznetzov, 1994
- Tomosvaryella troangulatus Kapoor, Grewal & Sharma, 1987
- Tomosvaryella trochanterata Kuznetzov, 1994
- Tomosvaryella trochantericola Kuznetzov, 1994
- Tomosvaryella tuberculatus Hardy, 1948
- Tomosvaryella tumida Hardy, 1940
- Tomosvaryella turgayica Kuznetzov, 1994
- Tomosvaryella turgida Hardy, 1940
- Tomosvaryella ubsunurensis Kuznetzov, 1994
- Tomosvaryella unguiculatus (Cresson, 1911)
- Tomosvaryella urdaensis Kuznetzov, 1994
- Tomosvaryella urgamalensis Kuznetzov, 1994
- Tomosvaryella utahensis (Hardy and Knowlton, 1939)
- Tomosvaryella vagabunda (Knab, 1915)
- Tomosvaryella venezuelana Ale-Rocha, 1993
- Tomosvaryella verrucula Kuznetzov, 1993
- Tomosvaryella vicina (Becker, 1900)
- Tomosvaryella virlai Ale-Rocha, 1996
- Tomosvaryella vittigera Kuznetzov, 1994
- Tomosvaryella wilburi (Hardy, 1939)
- Tomosvaryella xerophila Hardy, 1943
- Tomosvaryella zimini Kuznetzov, 1993
