= D. horridus =

D. horridus may refer to:

- Dasydorylas horridus (Becker, 1898), a fly species in the genus Dasydorylas and the family Pipunculidae native to Great Britain
- Deinodon horridus, a nomen dubium, a dubious scientific name of little use

== See also ==
- Horridus (disambiguation)
