= Jassidophaga fasciata =

Scientific classification
- Kingdom: Animalia
- Phylum: Arthropoda
- Clade: Pancrustacea
- Class: Insecta
- Order: Diptera
- Family: Pipunculidae
- Subfamily: Chalarinae
- Genus: Jassidophaga
- Species: J. fasciata

Binomial name
- Jassidophaga fasciata (von Roser, 1840)

Synonyms
- Pipunculus fasciatus Roser, 1840; Verrallia pilosa var. setosa Verrall, 1901

Species of fly

Jassidophaga fasciata is a species of fly in the family Pipunculidae.

== Distribution ==
Europe.
