= Cephalosphaera =

Cephalosphaera can mean:

- Cephalosphaera (fly), a genus of animals in the big-headed flies family (Pipunculidae)
- Cephalosphaera (plant), a genus of plants in the nutmeg family (Myristicaceae)
