= Jassidophaga villosa =

Scientific classification
- Kingdom: Animalia
- Phylum: Arthropoda
- Class: Insecta
- Order: Diptera
- Family: Pipunculidae
- Subfamily: Chalarinae
- Genus: Jassidophaga
- Species: J. villosa

Binomial name
- Jassidophaga villosa (von Roser, 1840)

Synonyms
- Pipunculus villosa Roser, 1840

Species of fly

Jassidophaga villosa is a species of fly in the family Pipunculidae.

== Distribution ==
Europe.
