= Tomosvaryella subvirescens =

Scientific classification
- Kingdom: Animalia
- Phylum: Arthropoda
- Clade: Pancrustacea
- Class: Insecta
- Order: Diptera
- Family: Pipunculidae
- Subfamily: Pipunculinae
- Tribe: Tomosvaryellini
- Genus: Tomosvaryella
- Species: T. subvirescens

Binomial name
- Tomosvaryella subvirescens (Loew, 1872)

Synonyms
- Pipunculus albiseta Cresson, 1911; Pipunculus aridus Williston, 1893; Pipunculus insularis Cresson, 1911; Pipunculus knowltoni Hardy, 1939; Pipunculus subvirescens Loew, 1872

Species of fly

Tomosvaryella subvirescens is a species of big-headed flies, insects in the family Pipunculidae.

== Distribution ==
United States. Canada, Bermuda, Palaearctic.
