= Dorylomorpha extricata =

Scientific classification
- Kingdom: Animalia
- Phylum: Arthropoda
- Clade: Pancrustacea
- Class: Insecta
- Order: Diptera
- Family: Pipunculidae
- Subfamily: Pipunculinae
- Tribe: Tomosvaryellini
- Genus: Dorylomorpha
- Species: D. extricata

Binomial name
- Dorylomorpha extricata (Collin, 1937)

Synonyms
- Pipunculus extricata Collin, 1937; Tomosvaryella insignis Aczél, 1939

Species of fly

Dorylomorpha extricata is a species of fly in the family Pipunculidae.

== Distribution ==
Austria, Belgium, Great Britain, Czech Republic, Denmark, France, Germany, Hungary, Latvia, Norway, Poland, Slovakia, Sweden, Switzerland, Netherlands.
