= Dorylomorpha infirmata =

Scientific classification
- Kingdom: Animalia
- Phylum: Arthropoda
- Clade: Pancrustacea
- Class: Insecta
- Order: Diptera
- Family: Pipunculidae
- Subfamily: Pipunculinae
- Tribe: Tomosvaryellini
- Genus: Dorylomorpha
- Species: D. infirmata

Binomial name
- Dorylomorpha infirmata (Collin, 1937)

Synonyms
- Pipunculus infirmata Collin, 1937

Species of fly

Dorylomorpha infirmata is a species of fly in the family Pipunculidae.

== Distribution ==
Belgium, Great Britain, Czech Republic, Denmark, Estonia, Finland, France, Germany, Ireland, Latvia, Russia, Norway, Sweden, Netherlands.
