= Dorylomorpha confusa =

Scientific classification
- Kingdom: Animalia
- Phylum: Arthropoda
- Clade: Pancrustacea
- Class: Insecta
- Order: Diptera
- Family: Pipunculidae
- Subfamily: Pipunculinae
- Tribe: Tomosvaryellini
- Genus: Dorylomorpha
- Species: D. confusa

Binomial name
- Dorylomorpha confusa (Verrall, 1901)

Synonyms
- Pipunculus confusa Verrall, 1901

Species of fly

Dorylomorpha confusa is a species of fly in the family Pipunculidae.

== Distribution ==
Austria, Belgium, Great Britain, Bulgaria, Russia, Czech Republic, Denmark, Estonia, Finland, France, Germany, Hungary, Italy, Latvia, Norway, Poland, Slovakia, Spain, Sweden, Switzerland, Netherlands, Ukraine.
