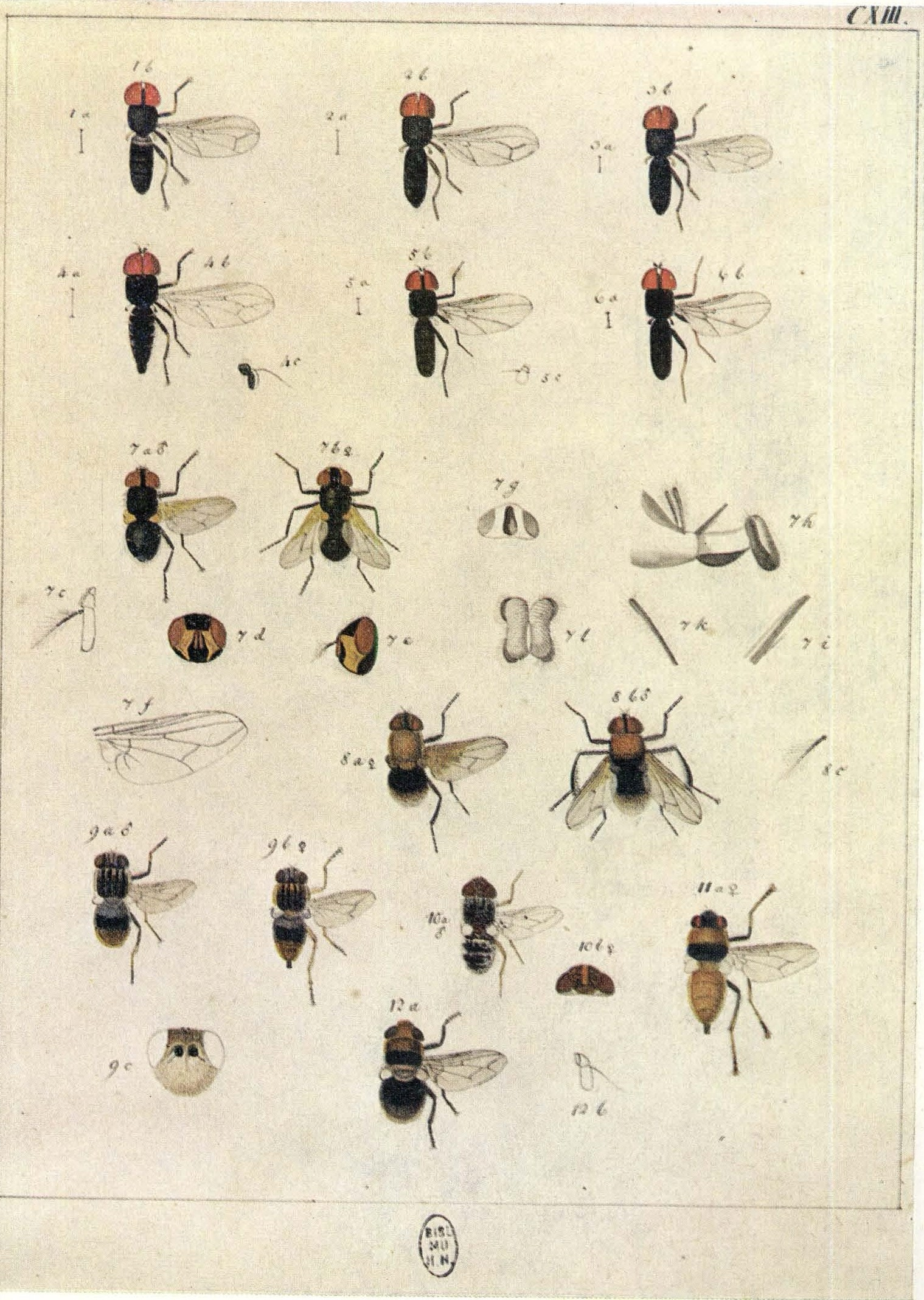
- Chalarus spurius depicted in Europäischen Zweiflügeligen (figure 6)

Scientific classification
- Kingdom: Animalia
- Phylum: Arthropoda
- Clade: Pancrustacea
- Class: Insecta
- Order: Diptera
- Family: Pipunculidae
- Subfamily: Chalarinae
- Genus: Chalarus
- Species: C. spurius

Binomial name
- Chalarus spurius (Fallen, 1816)

Synonyms
- Atelenevra obscurus Zetterstedt, 1838; Atelenevra velutinus Macquart, 1835; Cephalops spurius Fallén, 1816

= Chalarus spurius =

Species of fly

Chalarus spurius is a species of fly in the family Pipunculidae. It is found in the Palearctic.
