= Chalarus juliae =

Scientific classification
- Kingdom: Animalia
- Phylum: Arthropoda
- Clade: Pancrustacea
- Class: Insecta
- Order: Diptera
- Family: Pipunculidae
- Subfamily: Chalarinae
- Genus: Chalarus
- Species: C. juliae

Binomial name
- Chalarus juliae Jervis, 1992

Species of fly

Chalarus juliae is a species of fly in the family Pipunculidae.

== Distribution ==
Europe.
