= Tomosvaryella kuthyi =

Scientific classification
- Kingdom: Animalia
- Phylum: Arthropoda
- Clade: Pancrustacea
- Class: Insecta
- Order: Diptera
- Family: Pipunculidae
- Subfamily: Pipunculinae
- Tribe: Tomosvaryellini
- Genus: Tomosvaryella
- Species: T. kuthyi

Binomial name
- Tomosvaryella kuthyi Aczél, 1944

Species of fly

Tomosvaryella kuthyi is a species of fly in the family Pipunculidae.

== Distribution ==
Austria, Belgium, Great Britain, Bulgaria, Canary Islands, Croatia, Czech Republic, Denmark, Finland, France, Germany, Hungary, Italy, Crete, Latvia, Romania, Slovakia, Slovenia, Spain, Switzerland, Netherlands.
