= Dorylomorpha occidens =

Scientific classification
- Kingdom: Animalia
- Phylum: Arthropoda
- Clade: Pancrustacea
- Class: Insecta
- Order: Diptera
- Family: Pipunculidae
- Subfamily: Pipunculinae
- Tribe: Tomosvaryellini
- Genus: Dorylomorpha
- Species: D. occidens

Binomial name
- Dorylomorpha occidens (Hardy, 1939)

Synonyms
- Pipunculus atramonensis var. occidens Hardy, 1939

Species of fly

Dorylomorpha occidens is a species of fly in the family Pipunculidae.

== Distribution ==
United States (Alaska, Idaho), Great Britain, Russia, Estonia, Finland, Latvia, Norway, Sweden, Netherlands.
