= Tomosvaryella littoralis =

Scientific classification
- Kingdom: Animalia
- Phylum: Arthropoda
- Clade: Pancrustacea
- Class: Insecta
- Order: Diptera
- Family: Pipunculidae
- Subfamily: Pipunculinae
- Tribe: Tomosvaryellini
- Genus: Tomosvaryella
- Species: T. littoralis

Binomial name
- Tomosvaryella littoralis (Becker, 1897)

Synonyms
- Pipunculus littoralis Becker, 1897

Species of fly

Tomosvaryella littoralis is a species of fly in the family Pipunculidae. It is found in the Palearctic.
