= Chalarus holosericeus =

Scientific classification
- Kingdom: Animalia
- Phylum: Arthropoda
- Clade: Pancrustacea
- Class: Insecta
- Order: Diptera
- Family: Pipunculidae
- Subfamily: Chalarinae
- Genus: Chalarus
- Species: C. holosericeus

Binomial name
- Chalarus holosericeus (Meigen, 1824)

Synonyms
- Pipunculus holosericeus Meigen, 1824; Pipunculus sericeus Becker, 1897

Species of fly

Chalarus holosericeus is a species of fly in the family Pipunculidae.

== Distribution ==
Europe.
