= Chalarus indistinctus =

Scientific classification
- Kingdom: Animalia
- Phylum: Arthropoda
- Clade: Pancrustacea
- Class: Insecta
- Order: Diptera
- Family: Pipunculidae
- Subfamily: Chalarinae
- Genus: Chalarus
- Species: C. indistinctus

Binomial name
- Chalarus indistinctus Jervis, 1992

Species of fly

Chalarus indistinctus is a species of fly in the family Pipunculidae.

== Distribution ==
It is found in Europe.
