= Pipunculus hertzogi =

Scientific classification
- Kingdom: Animalia
- Phylum: Arthropoda
- Clade: Pancrustacea
- Class: Insecta
- Order: Diptera
- Family: Pipunculidae
- Subfamily: Pipunculinae
- Tribe: Pipunculini
- Genus: Pipunculus
- Species: P. hertzogi

Binomial name
- Pipunculus hertzogi (Rapp, 1943)

Synonyms
- Dorilas hertzogi Rapp, 1943

Species of fly

Pipunculus hertzogi is a species of fly in the family Pipunculidae. It is found in the United States.
