= Jassidophaga beatricis =

Scientific classification
- Kingdom: Animalia
- Phylum: Arthropoda
- Class: Insecta
- Order: Diptera
- Family: Pipunculidae
- Subfamily: Chalarinae
- Genus: Jassidophaga
- Species: J. beatricis

Binomial name
- Jassidophaga beatricis Coe, 1966

Synonyms
- Verrallia beatricis Coe, 1966

Species of fly

Jassidophaga beatricis is a species of fly in the family Pipunculidae.

== Distribution ==
Europe.
