= Dorylomorpha maculata =

Scientific classification
- Kingdom: Animalia
- Phylum: Arthropoda
- Clade: Pancrustacea
- Class: Insecta
- Order: Diptera
- Family: Pipunculidae
- Subfamily: Pipunculinae
- Tribe: Tomosvaryellini
- Genus: Dorylomorpha
- Species: D. maculata

Binomial name
- Dorylomorpha maculata (Walker, 1834)

Synonyms
- Pipunculus annulipes Zetterstedt, 1838; Pipunculus fulvipes Macquart, 1834; Pipunculus lateralis Macquart, 1834; Pipunculus maculatus Walker, 1834

Species of fly

Dorylomorpha maculata is a species of fly in the family Pipunculidae.

== Distribution ==
Austria, Great Britain, Russia, Czech Republic, Denmark, Estonia, Finland, France, Germany, Italy, Latvia, Lithuania, Norway, Poland, Slovakia, Sweden, Switzerland.
