= Dorylomorpha rufipes =

Scientific classification
- Kingdom: Animalia
- Phylum: Arthropoda
- Clade: Pancrustacea
- Class: Insecta
- Order: Diptera
- Family: Pipunculidae
- Subfamily: Pipunculinae
- Tribe: Tomosvaryellini
- Genus: Dorylomorpha
- Species: D. rufipes

Binomial name
- Dorylomorpha rufipes (Meigen, 1824)

Synonyms
- Pipunculus rufipes Meigen, 1824

Species of fly

Dorylomorpha rufipes is a species of fly in the family Pipunculidae.

== Distribution ==
Austria, Belgium, Great Britain, Czech Republic, Denmark, Estonia, Finland, France, Germany, Hungary, Latvia, Norway, Poland, Slovakia, Switzerland, Netherlands.
