= Dorylomorpha clavifemora =

Scientific classification
- Kingdom: Animalia
- Phylum: Arthropoda
- Clade: Pancrustacea
- Class: Insecta
- Order: Diptera
- Family: Pipunculidae
- Subfamily: Pipunculinae
- Tribe: Tomosvaryellini
- Genus: Dorylomorpha
- Species: D. clavifemora

Binomial name
- Dorylomorpha clavifemora Coe, 1966

Species of fly

Dorylomorpha clavifemora is a species of fly in the family Pipunculidae.

== Distribution ==
Great Britain, Czech Republic, Finland, Hungary, Latvia, Norway, Sweden.
