= Dorylomorpha haemorrhoidalis =

Scientific classification
- Kingdom: Animalia
- Phylum: Arthropoda
- Clade: Pancrustacea
- Class: Insecta
- Order: Diptera
- Family: Pipunculidae
- Subfamily: Pipunculinae
- Tribe: Tomosvaryellini
- Genus: Dorylomorpha
- Species: D. haemorrhoidalis

Binomial name
- Dorylomorpha haemorrhoidalis (Zetterstedt, 1838)

Synonyms
- Pipunculus haemorrhoidalis Zetterstedt, 1838

Species of fly

Dorylomorpha haemorrhoidalis is a species of fly in the family Pipunculidae.

== Distribution ==
Great Britain, Denmark, Estonia, Finland, Germany, Latvia, Lithuania, Russia, Norway, Sweden, Ukraine.
