= Tomosvaryella cilitarsis =

Scientific classification
- Kingdom: Animalia
- Phylum: Arthropoda
- Clade: Pancrustacea
- Class: Insecta
- Order: Diptera
- Family: Pipunculidae
- Subfamily: Pipunculinae
- Tribe: Tomosvaryellini
- Genus: Tomosvaryella
- Species: T. cilitarsis

Binomial name
- Tomosvaryella cilitarsis (Strobl, 1910)

Synonyms
- Pipunculus cilitarsis Strobl, 1910; Pipunculus forsiusi Frey, 1932

Species of fly

Tomosvaryella cilitarsis is a species of fly in the family Pipunculidae. The Pipunculidae, or the big-headed flies, are a characteristic group of flies related to the Syrphidae. They are easily recognised on their large compound eyes, which almost cover their spherical and flexible heads completely, and can otherwise be distinguished from syrphids by e.g. wings lacking a vena spuria and the parasitoid behaviour of the larvae.

== Distribution ==
Belgium, Great Britain, Czech Republic, Estonia, Finland, Germany, Italy, Latvia, Lithuania, North European Russia, Spain, Sweden, Switzerland, Netherlands.
