= Dorylomorpha hungarica =

Scientific classification
- Kingdom: Animalia
- Phylum: Arthropoda
- Clade: Pancrustacea
- Class: Insecta
- Order: Diptera
- Family: Pipunculidae
- Subfamily: Pipunculinae
- Tribe: Tomosvaryellini
- Genus: Dorylomorpha
- Species: D. hungarica

Binomial name
- Dorylomorpha hungarica (Aczél, 1939)

Synonyms
- Tomosvaryella hungarica Aczél, 1939

Species of fly

Dorylomorpha hungarica is a species of fly in the family Pipunculidae.

== Distribution ==
Austria, Belgium, Great Britain, Czech Republic, Denmark, Russia, Germany, Hungary, Latvia, Lithuania, Poland, Slovakia, Sweden, Switzerland, Netherlands, Ukraine.
