= Tomosvaryella palliditarsis =

Scientific classification
- Kingdom: Animalia
- Phylum: Arthropoda
- Clade: Pancrustacea
- Class: Insecta
- Order: Diptera
- Family: Pipunculidae
- Subfamily: Pipunculinae
- Tribe: Tomosvaryellini
- Genus: Tomosvaryella
- Species: T. palliditarsis

Binomial name
- Tomosvaryella palliditarsis (Collin, 1931)

Synonyms
- Pipunculus palliditarsis Collin, 1931; Pipunculus flavitarsis Collin, 1920

Species of fly

Tomosvaryella palliditarsis is a species of fly in the family Pipunculidae.

== Distribution ==
Belgium, Great Britain, Czech Republic, Germany, Latvia, Slovakia, Spain, Sweden.
