= Dorylomorpha anderssoni =

Scientific classification
- Kingdom: Animalia
- Phylum: Arthropoda
- Clade: Pancrustacea
- Class: Insecta
- Order: Diptera
- Family: Pipunculidae
- Subfamily: Pipunculinae
- Tribe: Tomosvaryellini
- Genus: Dorylomorpha
- Species: D. anderssoni

Binomial name
- Dorylomorpha anderssoni Albrecht, 1979

Species of fly

Dorylomorpha anderssoni is a species of fly in the family Pipunculidae

== Distribution ==
Great Britain, Denmark, Finland, Germany, Latvia, Norway, Sweden, Netherlands.
