= Dorylomorpha fennica =

Scientific classification
- Kingdom: Animalia
- Phylum: Arthropoda
- Clade: Pancrustacea
- Class: Insecta
- Order: Diptera
- Family: Pipunculidae
- Subfamily: Pipunculinae
- Tribe: Tomosvaryellini
- Genus: Dorylomorpha
- Species: D. fennica

Binomial name
- Dorylomorpha fennica Albrecht, 1979

Species of fly

Dorylomorpha fennica is a species of fly in the family Pipunculidae

== Distribution ==
Great Britain, Czech Republic, Denmark, Estonia, Finland, Germany, Hungary, Latvia, Slovakia, Sweden, Netherlands, Ukraine.
