= Jassidophaga =

Scientific classification
- Kingdom: Animalia
- Phylum: Arthropoda
- Class: Insecta
- Order: Diptera
- Superfamily: Syrphoidea
- Family: Pipunculidae
- Subfamily: Chalarinae
- Genus: Jassidophaga; Aczél, 1939

Type species
- Pipunculus pilosus Zetterstedt, 1838

Synonyms
- Jassidophaga Enderlein, 1936

Genus of flies

Jassidophaga is a genus of flies belonging to the family Pipunculidae.

== Species ==
- Jassidophaga abscissa (Thomson, 1869)
- Jassidophaga argentisegmentata (Brunetti, 1912)
- Jassidophaga armata (Thomson, 1869)
- Jassidophaga beatricis (Coe, 1966)
- Jassidophaga chiiensis (Ôuchi, 1943)
- Jassidophaga contracta Yang & Xu, 1998
- Jassidophaga eximia (Kuznetzov, 1993)
- Jassidophaga fasciata (Roser, 1840)
- Jassidophaga flavidipes De Meyer & Grootaert, 1992
- Jassidophaga guangxiensis Yang & Xu, 1998
- Jassidophaga hodosa (Kuznetzov, 1993)
- Jassidophaga japonica (Morakote, 1990)
- Jassidophaga kurilensis (Kuznetzov, 1993)
- Jassidophaga makarkini (Kuznetzov, 1993)
- Jassidophaga nearctica Kehlmaier, 2006
- Jassidophaga pala (Morakote, 1990)
- Jassidophaga pilosa (Zetterstedt, 1838)
- Jassidophaga plumbella (Brunetti, 1912)
- Jassidophaga pollinosa (Kuznetzov, 1993)
- Jassidophaga sidorenkoi (Kuznetzov, 1993)
- Jassidophaga speciosa (Kuznetzov, 1993)
- Jassidophaga verrucosa (Kuznetzov, 1993)
- Jassidophaga villosa (Roser, 1840)
