= Dorylomorpha albitarsis =

Scientific classification
- Kingdom: Animalia
- Phylum: Arthropoda
- Clade: Pancrustacea
- Class: Insecta
- Order: Diptera
- Family: Pipunculidae
- Subfamily: Pipunculinae
- Tribe: Tomosvaryellini
- Genus: Dorylomorpha
- Species: D. albitarsis

Binomial name
- Dorylomorpha albitarsis (Zetterstedt, 1844)

Synonyms
- Dorylomorpha ornata Hardy, 1943; Pipunculus albitarsis Zetterstedt, 1844

Species of fly

Dorylomorpha albitarsis is a species of fly in the family Pipunculidae.

== Distribution ==
Austria, Great Britain, Russia, Czech Republic, Denmark, Estonia, Finland, France, Germany, Italy, Latvia, Lithuania, Norway, Poland, Slovakia, Sweden, Switzerland.
