= Eudorylas focus =

Scientific classification
- Kingdom: Animalia
- Phylum: Arthropoda
- Clade: Pancrustacea
- Class: Insecta
- Order: Diptera
- Family: Pipunculidae
- Subfamily: Pipunculinae
- Tribe: Eudorylini
- Genus: Eudorylas
- Species: E. focus

Binomial name
- Eudorylas focus (Morakote & Yano, 1990)

Species of fly

Eudorylas focus is a species of fly in the family Pipunculidae.

== Distribution ==
Japan.
