= Tomosvaryella geniculata =

Scientific classification
- Kingdom: Animalia
- Phylum: Arthropoda
- Clade: Pancrustacea
- Class: Insecta
- Order: Diptera
- Family: Pipunculidae
- Subfamily: Pipunculinae
- Tribe: Tomosvaryellini
- Genus: Tomosvaryella
- Species: T. geniculata

Binomial name
- Tomosvaryella geniculata (Meigen, 1824)

Synonyms
- Pipunculus geniculata Meigen, 1824; Pipunculus griseipennis Verrall, 1900

Species of fly

Tomosvaryella geniculata is a species of fly in the family Pipunculidae.

== Distribution ==
Austria, Belgium, Great Britain, Bulgaria, Canary Islands, Croatia, Czech Republic, Denmark, France, Germany, Hungary, Italy, Latvia, Macedonia, Madeira Island, Poland, Romania, Slovakia, Spain, Sweden, Switzerland, Netherlands.
