= Dorylomorpha xanthopus =

Scientific classification
- Kingdom: Animalia
- Phylum: Arthropoda
- Clade: Pancrustacea
- Class: Insecta
- Order: Diptera
- Family: Pipunculidae
- Subfamily: Pipunculinae
- Tribe: Tomosvaryellini
- Genus: Dorylomorpha
- Species: D. xanthopus

Binomial name
- Dorylomorpha xanthopus (Thomson, 1870)

Synonyms
- Pipunculus xanthopus Thomson, 1870; Pipunculus semimaculata Becker, 1897

Species of fly

Dorylomorpha xanthopus is a species of fly in the family Pipunculidae. It is found in the Palearctic.
