= Jassidophaga pilosa =

Scientific classification
- Kingdom: Animalia
- Phylum: Arthropoda
- Class: Insecta
- Order: Diptera
- Family: Pipunculidae
- Subfamily: Chalarinae
- Genus: Jassidophaga
- Species: J. pilosa

Binomial name
- Jassidophaga pilosa (Zetterstedt, 1838)

Synonyms
- Pipunculus pilosus Zetterstedt, 1838

Species of fly

Jassidophaga pilosa is a species of fly in the family Pipunculidae.

== Distribution ==
Europe, North America.
