= Dorylomorpha beckeri =

Scientific classification
- Kingdom: Animalia
- Phylum: Arthropoda
- Clade: Pancrustacea
- Class: Insecta
- Order: Diptera
- Family: Pipunculidae
- Subfamily: Pipunculinae
- Tribe: Tomosvaryellini
- Genus: Dorylomorpha
- Species: D. beckeri

Binomial name
- Dorylomorpha beckeri (Aczél, 1939)

Synonyms
- Tomosvaryella beckeri Aczél, 1939

Species of fly

Dorylomorpha beckeri is a species of fly in the family Pipunculidae.

== Distribution ==
Austria, Great Britain, Czech Republic, Estonia, Finland, Germany, Hungary, Italy, Latvia, Russia, Norway, Sweden, Switzerland, Netherlands.
