= Tomosvaryella minima =

Scientific classification
- Kingdom: Animalia
- Phylum: Arthropoda
- Clade: Pancrustacea
- Class: Insecta
- Order: Diptera
- Family: Pipunculidae
- Subfamily: Pipunculinae
- Tribe: Tomosvaryellini
- Genus: Tomosvaryella
- Species: T. minima

Binomial name
- Tomosvaryella minima (Becker, 1898)

Synonyms
- Alloneura rondanii Collin, 1945; Pipunculus minima Becker, 1897

Species of fly

Tomosvaryella minima is a species of fly in the family Pipunculidae.

== Distribution ==
The species is found across Austria, Belgium, Great Britain, Bulgaria, Canary Islands, Croatia, Czech Republic, Denmark, Finland, France, Germany, Hungary, Italy, Crete, Latvia, Romania, Slovakia, Slovenia, Spain, Switzerland, and the Netherlands.
