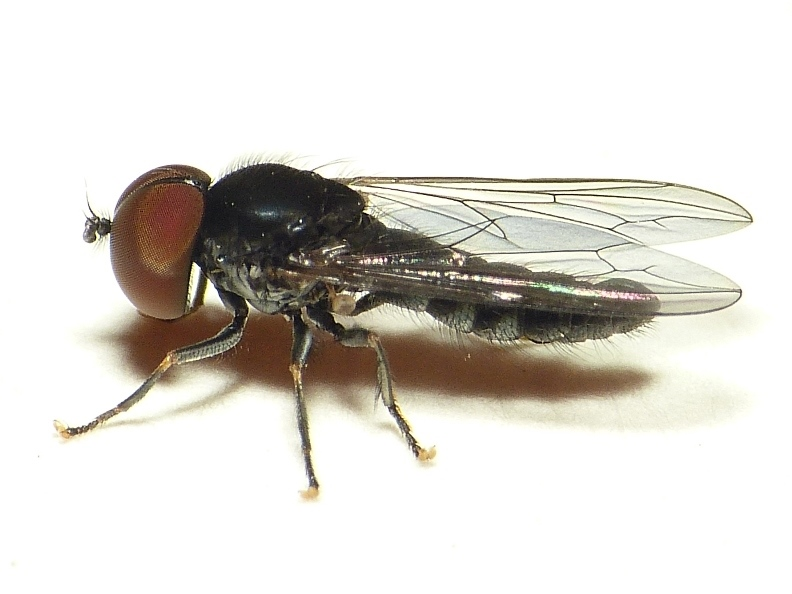
- Verrallia aucta Netherlands

Scientific classification
- Kingdom: Animalia
- Phylum: Arthropoda
- Class: Insecta
- Order: Diptera
- Family: Pipunculidae
- Subfamily: Chalarinae
- Genus: Verrallia
- Species: V. aucta

Binomial name
- Verrallia aucta (Fallen 1817)

Synonyms
- Cephalops aucta Fallen 1817; Verrallia helvetica Kuznetzov, 1993

= Verrallia aucta =

Species of insect

Verrallia aucta is a species of fly in the family Pipunculidae. It is found in the Palearctic.

== Hosts ==
Parasitoid on Philaenus spumarius. Because P. s. is the most common vector (in Europe) of the invasive agricultural disease Xylella fastidiosa, V. aucta is of great interest as a biological control. Insecticide application can produce paradoxical target rebound by hitting V. aucta as well as the intended P. spumarius. This is also a problem for tillage, but only specifically in April, due to the particularities of the V. aucta lifecycle. Although not terribly common anywhere, across all of Northern Italy it was most common in the Piedmont.
