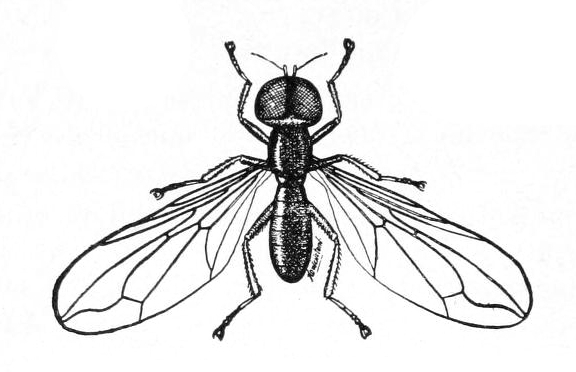
- Pipunculus fuscus

Scientific classification
- Kingdom: Animalia
- Phylum: Arthropoda
- Clade: Pancrustacea
- Class: Insecta
- Order: Diptera
- Family: Pipunculidae
- Subfamily: Pipunculinae
- Tribe: Pipunculini
- Genus: Pipunculus; Latreille, 1802

Type species
- Pipunculus campestris Latreille, 1802

Synonyms
- Dorylas Meigen, 1800; Microcera Meigen, 1803; Microcera Zetterstedt, 1837; Dorylas Kertész, 1910; Parapipunculus Rafael, 1986

= Pipunculus =

Genus of flies

Pipunculus is a genus of flies belonging to the family Pipunculidae. The genus has a cosmopolitan distribution.

== Species ==
- Pipunculus abnormis Skevington, 1998
- Pipunculus affinis Cresson, 1910
- Pipunculus albidus Skevington, 1998
- Pipunculus alternatus Cresson, 1910
- Pipunculus amurensis Kuznetzov, 1991
- Pipunculus amuricus Kuznetzov, 1991
- Pipunculus annulifemur Brunetti, 1923
- Pipunculus apicarinus Hardy & Knowlton, 1939
- Pipunculus artus (Kertész, 1915)
- Pipunculus avius Morakote, 1990
- Pipunculus babai Morakote, 1990
- Pipunculus basilicus Skevington, 1998
- Pipunculus bulbistylus Skevington, 1998
- Pipunculus calceatus Roser, 1840
- Pipunculus campestris Latreille, 1805
- Pipunculus carlestolrai Kuznetzov, 1993
- Pipunculus chiiensis (Ôuchi, 1943)
- Pipunculus cinereoaeneus Brunetti, 1912
- Pipunculus cingulatus Loew, 1866
- Pipunculus curvitibiae Hardy, 1939
- Pipunculus dentatus Skevington, 1998
- Pipunculus denticeps Kuznetzov, 1990
- Pipunculus depauperatus Lamb, 1922
- Pipunculus dimi Kuznetzov, 1991
- Pipunculus diuteus Morakote, 1990
- Pipunculus elegans Egger, 1860
- Pipunculus elegantulus Williston, 1892
- Pipunculus emiliae Kuznetzov, 1990
- Pipunculus ferepauculus Hardy, 1965
- Pipunculus flavicrus Rapp, 1946
- Pipunculus fonsecai Coe, 1966
- Pipunculus fuscus Loew, 1866
- Pipunculus gracilis (Kertész, 1912)
- Pipunculus hakuensis (Ôuchi, 1943)
- Pipunculus harmstori Hardy & Knowlton, 1939
- Pipunculus hastatus Skevington, 1998
- Pipunculus hertzogi Rapp, 1943
- Pipunculus himalayensis Brunetti, 1912
- Pipunculus horvathi Kertész, 1907
- Pipunculus houghi Kertész, 1900
- Pipunculus infandus Kuznetzov, 1991
- Pipunculus javanensis Meijere, 1907
- Pipunculus kondarensis Kuznetzov, 1991
- Pipunculus kotaneni Skevington, 1998
- Pipunculus kozlovi Kuznetzov, 1990
- Pipunculus kurilensis Kuznetzov, 1991
- Pipunculus lasifemoratus Hardy & Knowlton, 1939
- Pipunculus lenis Kuznetzov, 1991
- Pipunculus lentigue (Kertész, 1915)
- Pipunculus loewii Kertész, 1900
- Pipunculus luteicornis Cresson, 1911
- Pipunculus magnicarinatus Morakote, 1990
- Pipunculus maritimus Skevington, 1998
- Pipunculus minutulus Kuznetzov, 1991
- Pipunculus mirabilis Brunetti, 1912
- Pipunculus mongolicus Kuznetzov, 1990
- Pipunculus monticola Schummel, 1837
- Pipunculus mutillatus Loew, 1857
- Pipunculus nanus Skevington, 1998
- Pipunculus nigripes Loew, 1866
- Pipunculus nitor Morakote, 1990
- Pipunculus nodus Skevington, 1998
- Pipunculus oldenbergi Collin, 1956
- Pipunculus omissinervis Becker, 1889
- Pipunculus oshimensis (Ôuchi, 1943)
- Pipunculus pallipes Johnson, 1903
- Pipunculus papulus Skevington, 1998
- Pipunculus platystylus Skevington, 1998
- Pipunculus pumilionis Kuznetzov, 1991
- Pipunculus rafaeli Skevington, 1998
- Pipunculus rarus Morakote, 1990
- Pipunculus risbeci (Séguy, 1946)
- Pipunculus rokotensis (Ôuchi, 1943)
- Pipunculus roralis (Kertész, 1912)
- Pipunculus sajanicus Kuznetzov, 1991
- Pipunculus stackelbergi Kuznetzov, 1991
- Pipunculus subvaripes Morakote, 1990
- Pipunculus talgarensis Kuznetzov, 1991
- Pipunculus tanasijtshuki Kuznetzov, 1991
- Pipunculus tenuirostris Kozanek, 1981
- Pipunculus tibialis (Hardy, 1943)
- Pipunculus torus Skevington, 1998
- Pipunculus townsendi Malloch, 1912
- Pipunculus trichaetus Malloch, 1912
- Pipunculus tumbarinus Malloch, 1912
- Pipunculus ussuriensis Kuznetzov, 1991
- Pipunculus velutinus Cresson, 1911
- Pipunculus viduus Cresson, 1911
- Pipunculus violovitshi Kuznetzov, 1991
- Pipunculus wolfii Kowarz, 1887
- Pipunculus xanthopodus (Williston, 1892)
- Pipunculus zaitzevi Kuznetzov, 1990
- Pipunculus zinovjevi Kuznetzov, 1991
- Pipunculus zlobini Kuznetzov, 1991
- Pipunculus zugmayeriae Kowarz, 1887
