= Pipunculus omissinervis =

Scientific classification
- Kingdom: Animalia
- Phylum: Arthropoda
- Clade: Pancrustacea
- Class: Insecta
- Order: Diptera
- Family: Pipunculidae
- Subfamily: Pipunculinae
- Tribe: Pipunculini
- Genus: Pipunculus
- Species: P. omissinervis

Binomial name
- Pipunculus omissinervis Becker, 1889

Synonyms
- Pipunculus phaeton Coe, 1966; Pipunculus nartshukae Kuznetzov, 1990

Species of fly

Pipunculus omissinervis is a species of fly in the family Pipunculidae.

== Distribution ==
Great Britain, Germany, Hungary, Latvia, Slovakia, Spain, Switzerland, Mongolia.
