= Eudorylas inferus =

Scientific classification
- Kingdom: Animalia
- Phylum: Arthropoda
- Clade: Pancrustacea
- Class: Insecta
- Order: Diptera
- Family: Pipunculidae
- Subfamily: Pipunculinae
- Tribe: Eudorylini
- Genus: Eudorylas
- Species: E. inferus

Binomial name
- Eudorylas inferus Collin, 1956

Species of fly

Eudorylas inferus is a species of fly in the family Pipunculidae.

== Distribution ==
Belgium, Great Britain, Czech Republic, Denmark, Germany, Hungary, Italy, Latvia, Poland, Slovakia, Spain, Sweden, Switzerland, Netherlands.
