= Eudorylas auctus =

Scientific classification
- Kingdom: Animalia
- Phylum: Arthropoda
- Clade: Pancrustacea
- Class: Insecta
- Order: Diptera
- Family: Pipunculidae
- Subfamily: Pipunculinae
- Tribe: Eudorylini
- Genus: Eudorylas
- Species: E. auctus

Binomial name
- Eudorylas auctus Kehlmaier, 2005

Species of fly

Eudorylas auctus is a species of fly in the family Pipunculidae.

== Distribution ==
Wales.
