= Eudorylas fuscipes =

Scientific classification
- Kingdom: Animalia
- Phylum: Arthropoda
- Clade: Pancrustacea
- Class: Insecta
- Order: Diptera
- Family: Pipunculidae
- Subfamily: Pipunculinae
- Tribe: Eudorylini
- Genus: Eudorylas
- Species: E. fuscipes

Binomial name
- Eudorylas fuscipes (Zetterstedt, 1844)

Synonyms
- Pipunculus fuscipes Zetterstedt, 1844

Species of fly

Eudorylas fuscipes is a species of fly in the family Pipunculidae.

== Distribution ==
Austria, Belgium, Great Britain, Croatia, Czech Republic, Denmark, Finland, Germany, Hungary, Ireland, Italy, Latvia, Poland, Slovakia, Spain, Sweden, Switzerland, Netherlands
