= Eudorylas montium =

Scientific classification
- Kingdom: Animalia
- Phylum: Arthropoda
- Clade: Pancrustacea
- Class: Insecta
- Order: Diptera
- Family: Pipunculidae
- Subfamily: Pipunculinae
- Tribe: Eudorylini
- Genus: Eudorylas
- Species: E. montium

Binomial name
- Eudorylas montium (Becker, 1897)

Synonyms
- Pipunculus montium Becker, 1897

Species of fly

Eudorylas montium is a species of fly in the family Pipunculidae.

== Distribution ==
Austria, Belgium, Great Britain, Czech Republic, Denmark, Germany, Hungary, Italy, Latvia, Norway, Poland, Slovakia, Spain, Switzerland, Netherlands.
