= Eudorylas unicolor =

Scientific classification
- Kingdom: Animalia
- Phylum: Arthropoda
- Clade: Pancrustacea
- Class: Insecta
- Order: Diptera
- Family: Pipunculidae
- Subfamily: Pipunculinae
- Tribe: Eudorylini
- Genus: Eudorylas
- Species: E. unicolor

Binomial name
- Eudorylas unicolor (Zetterstedt, 1844)

Synonyms
- Pipunculus unicolor Zetterstedt, 1844

Species of fly

Eudorylas unicolor is a species of fly in the family Pipunculidae.

== Distribution ==
Austria, Great Britain, Bulgaria, Germany, Hungary, Latvia, Poland, Sweden, Switzerland.
