= Pipunculus fonsecai =

Scientific classification
- Kingdom: Animalia
- Phylum: Arthropoda
- Clade: Pancrustacea
- Class: Insecta
- Order: Diptera
- Family: Pipunculidae
- Subfamily: Pipunculinae
- Tribe: Pipunculini
- Genus: Pipunculus
- Species: P. fonsecai

Binomial name
- Pipunculus fonsecai Coe, 1966

Species of fly

Pipunculus fonsecai is a species of fly in the family Pipunculidae.

== Distribution ==
Belgium, Great Britain, Germany, Hungary, Italy, Latvia, Norway, Slovakia, Sweden, Netherlands.
