= Eudorylas longifrons =

Scientific classification
- Kingdom: Animalia
- Phylum: Arthropoda
- Clade: Pancrustacea
- Class: Insecta
- Order: Diptera
- Family: Pipunculidae
- Subfamily: Pipunculinae
- Tribe: Eudorylini
- Genus: Eudorylas
- Species: E. longifrons

Binomial name
- Eudorylas longifrons Coe, 1966

Species of fly

Eudorylas longifrons is a species of fly in the family Pipunculidae.

== Distribution ==
Belgium, Great Britain, Czech Republic, Denmark, Germany, Hungary, Latvia, Slovakia, Switzerland.
