= Pipunculus zugmayeriae =

Scientific classification
- Kingdom: Animalia
- Phylum: Arthropoda
- Clade: Pancrustacea
- Class: Insecta
- Order: Diptera
- Family: Pipunculidae
- Subfamily: Pipunculinae
- Tribe: Pipunculini
- Genus: Pipunculus
- Species: P. zugmayeriae

Binomial name
- Pipunculus zugmayeriae Kowarz, 1887

Species of fly

Pipunculus zugmayeriae is a species of fly in the family Pipunculidae.

== Distribution ==
Belgium, Great Britain, Czech Republic, Denmark, Finland, Germany, Hungary, Latvia, Poland, Slovakia, Switzerland, Netherlands.
