= Cephalosphaera furcata =

Scientific classification
- Kingdom: Animalia
- Phylum: Arthropoda
- Class: Insecta
- Order: Diptera
- Family: Pipunculidae
- Subfamily: Pipunculinae
- Tribe: Cephalopsini
- Genus: Cephalosphaera
- Species: C. furcata

Binomial name
- Cephalosphaera furcata (Egger, 1860)

Synonyms
- Pipunculus furcata Egger, 1860

Species of fly

Cephalosphaera furcata is a species of fly in the family Pipunculidae.

== Distribution ==
Europe.
