= Eudorylas zonatus =

Scientific classification
- Kingdom: Animalia
- Phylum: Arthropoda
- Clade: Pancrustacea
- Class: Insecta
- Order: Diptera
- Family: Pipunculidae
- Subfamily: Pipunculinae
- Tribe: Eudorylini
- Genus: Eudorylas
- Species: E. zonatus

Binomial name
- Eudorylas zonatus (Zetterstedt, 1849)

Synonyms
- Pipunculus zonatus Zetterstedt, 1849; Pipunculus distinctus Becker, 1921

Species of fly

Eudorylas zonatus is a species of fly in the family Pipunculidae.

== Distribution ==
Austria, Belgium, Great Britain, Bulgaria, Czech Republic, Finland, Germany, Hungary, Ireland, Latvia, Poland, Spain, Sweden, Switzerland, Netherlands, Yugoslavia.
