= Pipunculus lenis =

Scientific classification
- Kingdom: Animalia
- Phylum: Arthropoda
- Clade: Pancrustacea
- Class: Insecta
- Order: Diptera
- Family: Pipunculidae
- Subfamily: Pipunculinae
- Tribe: Pipunculini
- Genus: Pipunculus
- Species: P. lenis

Binomial name
- Pipunculus lenis Kuznetzov, 1991

Species of fly

Pipunculus lenis is a species of fly in the Genus Pipunculus in the family Pipunculidae.

== Distribution ==
Russia, Great Britain.
