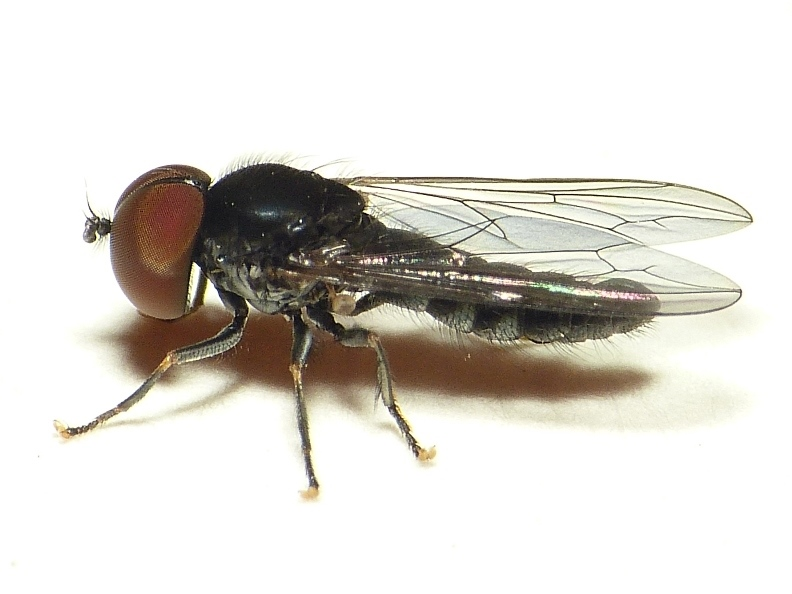
- Verrallia aucta Netherlands

Scientific classification
- Kingdom: Animalia
- Phylum: Arthropoda
- Class: Insecta
- Order: Diptera
- Superfamily: Syrphoidea
- Family: Pipunculidae
- Subfamily: Chalarinae
- Genus: Verrallia; Mik, 1899

Type species
- Cephalops acuta Fallén, 1817

Synonyms
- Verralia Meunier, 1903

= Verrallia =

Genus of flies

Verrallia is a genus of flies belonging to the family Pipunculidae.

== Species ==
- †Verrallia andreei Aczél, 1948
- Verrallia aucta (Fallén, 1817)
- Verrallia csikii Aczél, 1940
- †Verrallia exstincta Meunier, 1903
- Verrallia rebunensis Morakote, 1990
- Verrallia spectabilis Collin, 1941
- †Verrallia succinia Meunier, 1903
- Verrallia virginica Banks, 1915
