= Pipunculus elegans =

Scientific classification
- Kingdom: Animalia
- Phylum: Arthropoda
- Clade: Pancrustacea
- Class: Insecta
- Order: Diptera
- Family: Pipunculidae
- Subfamily: Pipunculinae
- Tribe: Pipunculini
- Genus: Pipunculus
- Species: P. elegans

Binomial name
- Pipunculus elegans Egger, 1860

Species of fly

Pipunculus elegans is a species of fly in the family Pipunculidae.

== Distribution ==
Great Britain, Finland.
