= Cephalosphaera germanica =

Scientific classification
- Kingdom: Animalia
- Phylum: Arthropoda
- Class: Insecta
- Order: Diptera
- Family: Pipunculidae
- Subfamily: Pipunculinae
- Tribe: Cephalopsini
- Genus: Cephalosphaera
- Species: C. germanica

Binomial name
- Cephalosphaera germanica Aczél, 1940

Species of fly

Cephalosphaera germanica is a species of fly in the family Pipunculidae.

== Distribution ==
Sweden, England, Netherlands, Germany.
