= Eudorylas coloratus =

Scientific classification
- Kingdom: Animalia
- Phylum: Arthropoda
- Clade: Pancrustacea
- Class: Insecta
- Order: Diptera
- Family: Pipunculidae
- Subfamily: Pipunculinae
- Tribe: Eudorylini
- Genus: Eudorylas
- Species: E. coloratus

Binomial name
- Eudorylas coloratus (Becker, 1897)

Synonyms
- Pipunculus coloratus Becker, 1897

Species of fly

Eudorylas coloratus is a species of fly in the family Pipunculidae.

== Distribution ==
Austria, Germany, Great Britain, Latvia, Lithuania, Poland, Romania, Sweden.
