= Pipunculus tenuirostris =

Scientific classification
- Kingdom: Animalia
- Phylum: Arthropoda
- Clade: Pancrustacea
- Class: Insecta
- Order: Diptera
- Family: Pipunculidae
- Subfamily: Pipunculinae
- Tribe: Pipunculini
- Genus: Pipunculus
- Species: P. tenuirostris

Binomial name
- Pipunculus tenuirostris Kozánek, 1981

Species of fly

Pipunculus tenuirostris is a species of fly in the family Pipunculidae.

== Distribution ==
Belgium, Great Britain, Czech Republic, Denmark, Germany, Hungary, Italy, Latvia, Slovakia, Sweden, Switzerland, Netherlands.
