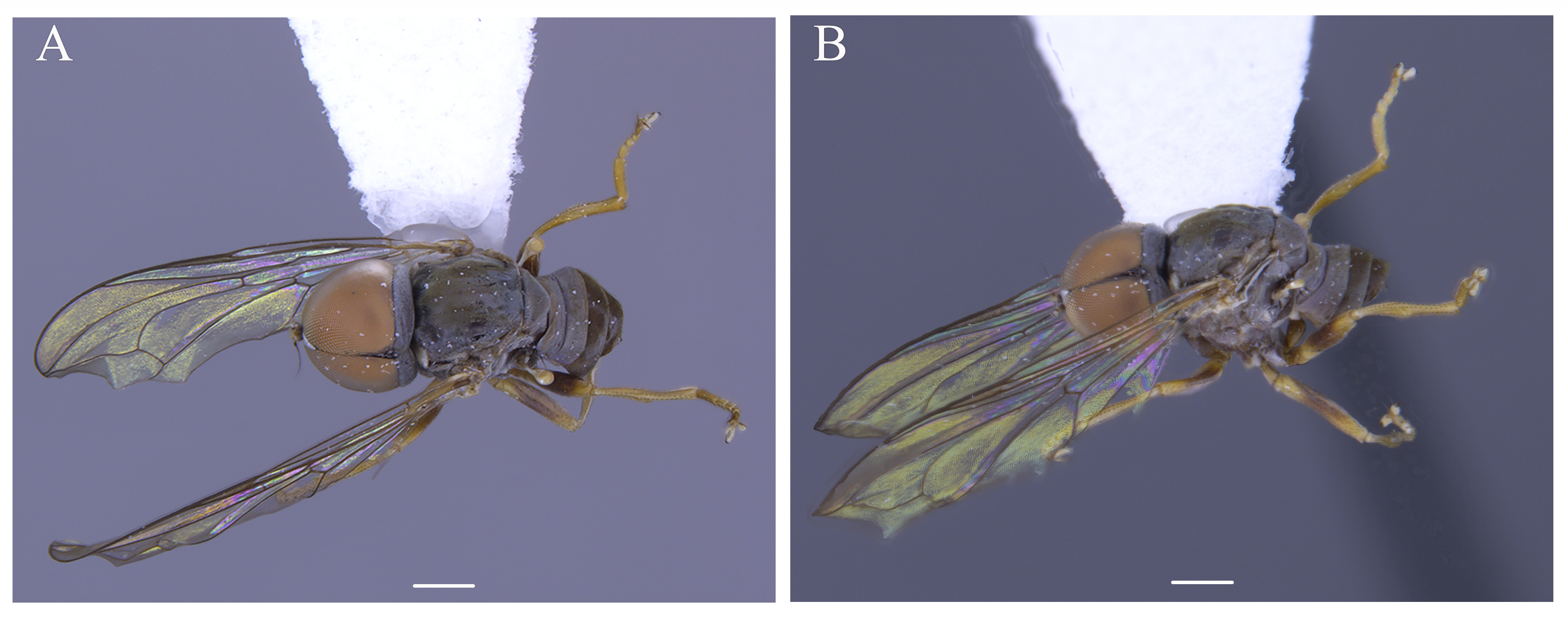
- Eudorylas corniculans

Scientific classification
- Kingdom: Animalia
- Phylum: Arthropoda
- Clade: Pancrustacea
- Class: Insecta
- Order: Diptera
- Family: Pipunculidae
- Subfamily: Pipunculinae
- Tribe: Eudorylini
- Genus: Eudorylas; Aczél, 1940

Type species
- Pipunculus fuscipes Zetterstedt, 1844

Synonyms
- Metadorylas Rafael, 1987; Neodorylas Kuznetzov, 1995

= Eudorylas =

Genus of flies

Eudorylas is a genus of flies in the family Pipunculidae.

== Species ==
- Eudorylas abdominalis (Loew, 1858)
- Eudorylas aberratus (Hardy & Knowlton, 1939)
- Eudorylas ablus (Hardy, 1954)
- Eudorylas abnorexitus Morakote & Yano, 1990
- Eudorylas abnormalis Rafael & Menezes, 1999
- Eudorylas abruptus (Hardy, 1952)
- Eudorylas absonditus (Hardy, 1954)
- Eudorylas accedens (Hardy, 1954)
- Eudorylas acroacanthus (Hardy, 1968)
- Eudorylas acroapex (Hardy, 1962)
- Eudorylas aculeatus (Loew, 1858)
- Eudorylas adunatus (Hardy, 1965)
- Eudorylas aduncus Dunk, 1995
- Eudorylas aemulus (Hardy, 1949)
- Eudorylas aequus (Cresson, 1911)
- Eudorylas aethiopicus (Hardy, 1949)
- Eudorylas affinis (Cresson, 1910)
- Eudorylas albinervis Kuznetzov, 1990
- Eudorylas albucus (Hardy, 1968)
- Eudorylas alternatus (Cresson, 1910)
- Eudorylas amanii Földvári, 2003
- Eudorylas amitinus (Hardy, 1962)
- Eudorylas amurensis Kuznetzov, 1990
- Eudorylas amuscarium (Hardy, 1960)
- Eudorylas anaclastus Skevington, 2003
- Eudorylas andinus Rafael, 1991
- Eudorylas anfractus Skevington, 2003
- Eudorylas angustimembranus Kozánek, 1991
- Eudorylas angustipennis (Kertész, 1903)
- Eudorylas angustus (Hardy, 1952)
- Eudorylas anomalus (Hardy, 1968)
- Eudorylas antennalis Kapoor, Grewal & Sharma, 1987
- Eudorylas antillensis (Rafael, 1996)
- Eudorylas apicalis (Hardy & Knowlton, 1939)
- Eudorylas apiculatus (Hardy, 1961)
- Eudorylas appendiculatus Kozánek, 1991
- Eudorylas aptus (Hardy, 1972)
- Eudorylas aquavicinus (Hardy, 1943)
- Eudorylas aquinoi Rafael, 1990
- Eudorylas arcanus Coe, 1966
- Eudorylas argryofrons (Hardy & Knowlton, 1939)
- Eudorylas arthurianus (Tonnoir, 1925)
- Eudorylas arundani (Hardy, 1954)
- Eudorylas arvazensis Kuznetzov, 1994
- Eudorylas ashoroensis Morakote & Yano, 1990
- Eudorylas atratus (Meijere, 1914)
- Eudorylas atrigonius Huo & Yang, 2010
- Eudorylas attenuatus (Yang & Xu, 1989)
- Eudorylas auctus Kehlmaier, 2005
- Eudorylas avid Motamedinia & Skevington, 2020
- Eudorylas barkalovi Kuznetzov, 1990
- Eudorylas barrettoi (Hardy, 1965)
- Eudorylas bartaki Kozánek, 1993
- Eudorylas barueriensis (Hardy, 1965)
- Eudorylas beckeri (Kertész, 1903)
- Eudorylas beiyue Yang & Xu, 1998
- Eudorylas bentoni Rafael, 1990
- Eudorylas bermeri Kehlmaier, 2005
- Eudorylas bharatiensis Kapoor, Grewal & Sharma, 1987
- Eudorylas bicolor (Becker, 1924)
- Eudorylas bicostalis Kapoor, Grewal & Sharma, 1987
- Eudorylas bidactylus (Hardy, 1943)
- Eudorylas bihamatus Motamedinia & Skevington, 2020
- Eudorylas bilobatus Shi, Hu & Yang, 2019
- Eudorylas bilobus (Hardy, 1947)
- Eudorylas bipertitus Kehlmaier, 2005
- Eudorylas biroi (Kertész, 1903)
- Eudorylas bisetosus (Hardy, 1962)
- Eudorylas blascoi De Meyer, 1997
- Eudorylas boliviensis (Rafael, 1991)
- Eudorylas bredoi (Hardy, 1949)
- Eudorylas brevisalus Morakote & Yano, 1990
- Eudorylas brunnipennis (Becker, 1900)
- Eudorylas bulbosus Rafael, 1995
- Eudorylas burmanicus (Hardy, 1972)
- Eudorylas buscki (Malloch, 1912)
- Eudorylas caccabatus Rafael, 1990
- Eudorylas caledonicus Ackland, 1999
- Eudorylas carpathicus Kozánek, 1993
- Eudorylas caudatus (Cresson, 1910)
- Eudorylas cernuus Skevington, 2003
- Eudorylas chilensis (Rafael, 1991)
- Eudorylas chvalai Kozánek, 1988
- Eudorylas ciliatus (Meijere, 1907)
- Eudorylas cinerascens (Perkins, 1905)
- Eudorylas clausum Skevington, 2003
- Eudorylas coei Kehlmaier, 2005
- Eudorylas collinus Skevington, 2003
- Eudorylas coloratus (Becker, 1897)
- Eudorylas comparatus (Hardy, 1972)
- Eudorylas concavus Yang & Xu, 1998
- Eudorylas concolor (Rafael, 1991)
- Eudorylas conformis (Hardy, 1959)
- Eudorylas consimilis Rafael, 1989
- Eudorylas corbetti Kapoor, Grewal & Sharma, 1987
- Eudorylas cordatus Skevington, 2003
- Eudorylas corniculans Motamedinia & Skevington, 2020
- Eudorylas cornutus (Rafael, 1996)
- Eudorylas costalis (Becker, 1924)
- Eudorylas cralimes Morakote & Yano, 1990
- Eudorylas crassus (Bezzi, 1926)
- Eudorylas cressoni (Johnson, 1919)
- Eudorylas cupreiventris (Becker, 1914)
- Eudorylas curtus (Hardy, 1943)
- Eudorylas curvatus (Hardy, 1954)
- Eudorylas curvicaudatus Rafael, 1996
- Eudorylas cuspicornis (Kertész, 1915)
- Eudorylas cycnus Morakote & Yano, 1990
- Eudorylas dactylus Skevington, 2003
- Eudorylas deansi (Tonnoir, 1925)
- Eudorylas deceptor (Hardy, 1968)
- Eudorylas decorus (Hardy, 1950)
- Eudorylas definitus (Hardy, 1961)
- Eudorylas delfinadoae (Hardy, 1972)
- Eudorylas demeyeri Kozánek, 1993
- Eudorylas denotatus (Hardy, 1960)
- Eudorylas devius (Hardy, 1965)
- Eudorylas dextratus (Hardy, 1965)
- Eudorylas dextrostylus Kapoor, Grewal & Sharma, 1987
- Eudorylas diagonalis Morakote & Yano, 1990
- Eudorylas dichopticus Kuznetzov, 1990
- Eudorylas dicranus Huo & Yang, 2010
- Eudorylas digitatus Yang & Xu, 1998
- Eudorylas discretus (Hardy, 1952)
- Eudorylas disgregus (Hardy, 1965)
- Eudorylas diversus (Hardy, 1949)
- Eudorylas dives (Hardy, 1947)
- Eudorylas dominicanensis Rafael, 1996
- Eudorylas dominicensis (Scarbrough & Knutson, 1989)
- Eudorylas dorsispinosus (Hardy, 1965)
- Eudorylas dreisbachi (Hardy, 1948)
- Eudorylas duckei Rafael, 1995
- Eudorylas dumicolus (Hardy, 1962)
- Eudorylas duocollis Morakote & Yano, 1990
- Eudorylas duplicatus Rafael, 1995
- Eudorylas echinatus Rafael & Menezes, 1999
- Eudorylas elephas (Becker, 1897)
- Eudorylas encerus (Hardy, 1949)
- Eudorylas ephippium Skevington, 2003
- Eudorylas eremitus (Hardy, 1954)
- Eudorylas eremnoptera (Hardy, 1962)
- Eudorylas euciliatus Kapoor, Grewal & Sharma, 1987
- Eudorylas eulentiger Kapoor, Grewal & Sharma, 1987
- Eudorylas evanidus (Hardy, 1949)
- Eudorylas excisus (Hardy, 1949)
- Eudorylas expletirubus Morakote & Yano, 1990
- Eudorylas extensus (Brunetti, 1923)
- Eudorylas facetus (Hardy, 1962)
- Eudorylas falcatus (Hardy, 1949)
- Eudorylas falcifer De Meyer, 1997
- Eudorylas falx Rafael & Menezes, 1999
- Eudorylas fascipes (Zetterstedt, 1844)
- Eudorylas filicornis (Brunetti, 1912)
- Eudorylas flavicornis (Williston, 1892)
- Eudorylas flavicrus De Meyer, 1995
- Eudorylas flavitarsis (Williston, 1892)
- Eudorylas flavitibia (Rafael, 1991)
- Eudorylas flexus (Hardy, 1949)
- Eudorylas fluviatilis (Becker, 1900)
- Eudorylas focus Morakote & Yano, 1990
- Eudorylas fortis Rafael, 1995
- Eudorylas fractus (Hardy, 1962)
- Eudorylas fritzi (Rafael, 1991)
- Eudorylas fujianensis Xu, 2003
- Eudorylas fukushimaensis Morakote & Yano, 1990
- Eudorylas fumipennis (Kertész, 1903)
- Eudorylas furvulus Collin, 1956
- Eudorylas fuscipennis (Brunetti, 1927)
- Eudorylas fuscipes (Zetterstedt, 1844)
- Eudorylas fuscitarsis (Adams, 1903)
- Eudorylas fuscitibia (Rafael, 1991)
- Eudorylas fusculus (Zetterstedt, 1844)
- Eudorylas fustis Morakote & Yano, 1990
- Eudorylas galeatus (Hardy, 1949)
- Eudorylas garambensis (Hardy, 1961)
- Eudorylas garhwalensis Kapoor, Grewal & Sharma, 1987
- Eudorylas gemellus Kehlmaier, 2005
- Eudorylas ghesquierei (Hardy, 1950)
- Eudorylas gilvipes Morakote & Yano, 1990
- Eudorylas globosus Yang & Xu, 1998
- Eudorylas goennersdorfensis Dempewolf & Dunk, 1996
- Eudorylas golbachi (Hardy, 1965)
- Eudorylas gomesi (Hardy, 1954)
- Eudorylas gorodkovi Kuznetzov, 1990
- Eudorylas grandis (Hardy, 1943)
- Eudorylas gratiosus (Kertész, 1915)
- Eudorylas gressitti (Hardy, 1956)
- Eudorylas hadrosoma (Hardy, 1962)
- Eudorylas hamatus Skevington, 2003
- Eudorylas hardyi (Yang & Xu, 1989)
- Eudorylas harmstoni (Hardy & Knowlton, 1939)
- Eudorylas harrisi (Tonnoir, 1925)
- Eudorylas hasanicus Kuznetzov, 1990
- Eudorylas hokkaidoensis Morakote & Yano, 1990
- Eudorylas huachucanus (Hardy, 1943)
- Eudorylas hystricosus Skevington, 2003
- Eudorylas ibericus Kehlmaier, 2005
- Eudorylas imbricatus Rafael, 1995
- Eudorylas incisus Rafael, 1993
- Eudorylas indiaensis Kapoor, Grewal & Sharma, 1987
- Eudorylas indivisus (Hardy, 1972)
- Eudorylas industrius (Knab, 1915)
- Eudorylas inferus Collin, 1956
- Eudorylas inopsicolor Morakote & Yano, 1990
- Eudorylas inornatus (Hardy, 1949)
- Eudorylas insignis (Hardy, 1954)
- Eudorylas jacksoni Kapoor, Grewal & Sharma, 1987
- Eudorylas jakuticus Kuznetzov, 1990
- Eudorylas janae Kozánek, 1991
- Eudorylas javanensis (Meijere, 1907)
- Eudorylas jenkinsoni Coe, 1966
- Eudorylas jesoensis (Matsumura, 1915)
- Eudorylas johnenae Dempewolf, 1996
- Eudorylas kansensis (Hardy, 1940)
- Eudorylas kaszabi Kozánek, 1992
- Eudorylas kataplisso Kehlmaier, 2005
- Eudorylas katonae (Kertész, 1907)
- Eudorylas kerzhneri Kuznetzov, 1990
- Eudorylas khaziarensis Kapoor, Grewal & Sharma, 1987
- Eudorylas kondarensis Kuznetzov, 1990
- Eudorylas kovaljovi Kuznetzov, 1990
- Eudorylas kowarzi (Becker, 1898)
- Eudorylas kozaneki De Meyer, 1993
- Eudorylas lamellatus (Collin, 1941)
- Eudorylas largexitus Morakote & Yano, 1990
- Eudorylas lasiofemoratus (Hardy & Knowlton, 1939)
- Eudorylas latipennis (Banks, 1915)
- Eudorylas latistomachus Morakote & Yano, 1990
- Eudorylas lautus (Hardy, 1943)
- Eudorylas lentiger (Kertész, 1912)
- Eudorylas lepus (Rafael, 1991)
- Eudorylas liberia (Curran, 1929)
- Eudorylas libratus (Hardy, 1949)
- Eudorylas ligo Morakote & Yano, 1990
- Eudorylas lividus (Hardy, 1954)
- Eudorylas loewii (Kertész, 1900)
- Eudorylas longicornis Yang & Xu, 1998
- Eudorylas longifrons Coe, 1966
- Eudorylas longipilus (Hardy, 1948)
- Eudorylas longispinus Yang & Xu, 1998
- Eudorylas longistigmus Morakote & Yano, 1990
- Eudorylas longus Rafael, 1995
- Eudorylas lopesi (Hardy, 1954)
- Eudorylas ludhianaensis Kapoor, Grewal & Sharma, 1987
- Eudorylas luteipes (Brunetti, 1923)
- Eudorylas luteiventris Morakote & Yano, 1990
- Eudorylas luteolus (Hardy, 1972)
- Eudorylas luteopilus (Hardy, 1962)
- Eudorylas macrocercus Rafael, 1997
- Eudorylas maesi Rafael, 2004
- Eudorylas major (Brunetti, 1923)
- Eudorylas malaisei (Hardy, 1972)
- Eudorylas maleficus Morakote & Yano, 1990
- Eudorylas mallee Skevington, 2003
- Eudorylas manaliensis Kapoor, Grewal & Sharma, 1987
- Eudorylas manasi Kehlmaier, 2011
- Eudorylas maurus Rafael, 1991
- Eudorylas mediterraneus De Meyer & Ackland, 1997
- Eudorylas megacanthus (Hardy, 1961)
- Eudorylas megacephalus (Kertész, 1912)
- Eudorylas megasurstylus Rafael, 1990
- Eudorylas melanotrichus Rafael, 1995
- Eudorylas meniscatus Yang & Xu, 1998
- Eudorylas meristus Skevington, 2003
- Eudorylas meruensis (Hardy, 1949)
- Eudorylas mexicanus (Hardy, 1949)
- Eudorylas michiganensis (Hardy, 1948)
- Eudorylas mikenensis (Hardy, 1950)
- Eudorylas minghlanii Kapoor, Grewal & Sharma, 1987
- Eudorylas minor (Cresson, 1911)
- Eudorylas minutus Morakote & Yano, 1990
- Eudorylas minymerus (Hardy, 1962)
- Eudorylas misericors Morakote & Yano, 1990
- Eudorylas modestus (Haliday, 1833)
- Eudorylas modicus (Hardy, 1949)
- Eudorylas moffattensis Skevington, 2003
- Eudorylas monegrensis De Meyer, 1997
- Eudorylas mongolorum Kuznetzov, 1990
- Eudorylas montanus (Meijere, 1914)
- Eudorylas montium (Becker, 1897)
- Eudorylas moragai Rafael & Menezes, 1999
- Eudorylas muiri (Hardy, 1972)
- Eudorylas mutillatus (Loew, 1858)
- Eudorylas nasicus Motamedinia & Skevington, 2020
- Eudorylas nasus Morakote & Yano, 1990
- Eudorylas natalensis (Hardy, 1949)
- Eudorylas nataliae Kuznetzov, 1990
- Eudorylas neimongolanus (Xu & Yang, 1991)
- Eudorylas nemoralis Kozánek, 1993
- Eudorylas nevadaensis (Hardy, 1943)
- Eudorylas nigellus Rafael, 1991
- Eudorylas nigripes (Loew, 1866)
- Eudorylas ningxiaensis Yang & Xu, 1998
- Eudorylas nomurai Morakote & Yano, 1990
- Eudorylas nudus (Kertész, 1912)
- Eudorylas obliquus Coe, 1966
- Eudorylas obscurus Coe, 1966
- Eudorylas occultus (Hardy, 1950)
- Eudorylas ocularis (Matsumura, 1915)
- Eudorylas odontophorus Rafael, 1995
- Eudorylas okalii Kozánek, 2004
- Eudorylas opinatus (Hardy, 1950)
- Eudorylas opiparus (Hardy, 1954)
- Eudorylas optabilis Kuznetzov, 1990
- Eudorylas orthogoninus (Yang & Xu, 1989)
- Eudorylas oscen Morakote & Yano, 1990
- Eudorylas oshimaensis Morakote & Yano, 1990
- Eudorylas oxianus Kuznetzov, 1990
- Eudorylas pachymerus Rafael, 1989
- Eudorylas pallidiventris (Meijere, 1914)
- Eudorylas pamirorum Kuznetzov, 1990
- Eudorylas pannonicus (Becker, 1897)
- Eudorylas paraappendiculatus Kozánek, Suh & Kwon, 2004
- Eudorylas paranaensis Rafael, 1995
- Eudorylas pardus Kuznetzov, 1990
- Eudorylas parens Kuznetzov, 1990
- Eudorylas parilis (Hardy, 1972)
- Eudorylas partitus (Hardy, 1965)
- Eudorylas parvifrons (Loew, 1858)
- Eudorylas parvulus (Wulp, 1898)
- Eudorylas pectitibialis (Hardy, 1954)
- Eudorylas penai Rafael, 1995
- Eudorylas pennatus Kapoor, Grewal & Sharma, 1987
- Eudorylas petalus Skevington, 2003
- Eudorylas phallophylax Rafael, 1995
- Eudorylas phatnomus (Hardy, 1968)
- Eudorylas pilosus (Rafael, 1996)
- Eudorylas pinjorensis Kapoor, Grewal & Sharma, 1987
- Eudorylas pinquis Morakote & Yano, 1990
- Eudorylas piriformis (Xu & Yang, 1991)
- Eudorylas platyapodemalis Rafael, 2004
- Eudorylas platytarsis (Kertész, 1912)
- Eudorylas poantaensis Kapoor, Grewal & Sharma, 1987
- Eudorylas pondolandi Földvári, 2003
- Eudorylas porrectus (Hardy, 1949)
- Eudorylas posticus (Collin, 1931)
- Eudorylas productus Morakote & Yano, 1990
- Eudorylas pusillus (Hardy, 1949)
- Eudorylas quadratus (Hardy, 1949)
- Eudorylas quadrifidus Rafael, 1995
- Eudorylas quartarius (Brunetti, 1912)
- Eudorylas quinquepertitus Kehlmaier, 2005
- Eudorylas rectinervis (Collin, 1941)
- Eudorylas regalis (Curran, 1928)
- Eudorylas remiformis (Hardy, 1962)
- Eudorylas remotus (Hardy, 1972)
- Eudorylas restrictus Coe, 1966
- Eudorylas revolutus (Yang & Xu, 1989)
- Eudorylas rubidus (Hardy, 1948)
- Eudorylas rubrus (Hardy, 1950)
- Eudorylas rudis Morakote & Yano, 1990
- Eudorylas rurestris Kuznetzov, 1990
- Eudorylas rusticus Kuznetzov, 1990
- Eudorylas sabroskyi (Hardy, 1943)
- Eudorylas sauteri (Kertész, 1907)
- Eudorylas scharffi Földvári, 2003
- Eudorylas schreiteri (Shannon, 1927)
- Eudorylas scissus (Hardy, 1972)
- Eudorylas scotinus (Collin, 1931)
- Eudorylas scutellatus Kapoor, Grewal & Sharma, 1987
- Eudorylas semicircularis Xu, 2003
- Eudorylas semiopacus (Lamb, 1922)
- Eudorylas separatus (Kertész, 1915)
- Eudorylas serratus Rafael & Menezes, 1999
- Eudorylas setiformis (Hardy, 1949)
- Eudorylas sherloukensis Kuznetzov, 1990
- Eudorylas similis (Hardy, 1950)
- Eudorylas simulator (Collin, 1931)
- Eudorylas sinuosus (Hardy, 1949)
- Eudorylas slovacus Kozánek, 1993
- Eudorylas soccatus Kuznetzov, 1990
- Eudorylas souzalopesi Rafael, 1990
- Eudorylas spinosus (Hardy, 1948)
- Eudorylas stackelbergi Kuznetzov, 1990
- Eudorylas stainsi (Hardy, 1943)
- Eudorylas stigmaticus (Malloch, 1912)
- Eudorylas straeleni (Janssens, 1955)
- Eudorylas subfascipes Collin, 1956
- Eudorylas subjectus (Collin, 1931)
- Eudorylas subligo Morakote & Yano, 1990
- Eudorylas subopacus (Loew, 1866)
- Eudorylas subterminalis Collin, 1956
- Eudorylas subtilis (Hardy, 1943)
- Eudorylas subvaralis (Hardy, 1972)
- Eudorylas subvexus Rafael, 2004
- Eudorylas sulcatus (Becker, 1897)
- Eudorylas suwai Morakote & Yano, 1990
- Eudorylas swanengi Földvári, 2003
- Eudorylas tadzhikorum Kuznetzov, 1990
- Eudorylas tanasijtshuki Kuznetzov, 1990
- Eudorylas tanycerus Rafael, 1991
- Eudorylas tanzaniensis Földvári, 2003
- Eudorylas tarsalis (Banks, 1911)
- Eudorylas terminalis (Thomson, 1870)
- Eudorylas terraboensis Rafael, 1995
- Eudorylas tibiatus Kapoor, Grewal & Sharma, 1987
- Eudorylas titanus Kuznetzov, 1990
- Eudorylas totoflavus (Hardy, 1972)
- Eudorylas trapezoides (Becker, 1900)
- Eudorylas triangularis Kehlmaier, 2005
- Eudorylas trichosubepandrialis Rafael, 2004
- Eudorylas trigonus (Becker, 1921)
- Eudorylas tropidoapex (Hardy, 1965)
- Eudorylas tshatkalensis Kuznetzov, 1990
- Eudorylas tshuki Kuznetzov, 1990
- Eudorylas tuberculatus Kapoor, Grewal & Sharma, 1987
- Eudorylas tucumanus (Shannon, 1927)
- Eudorylas turneri (Hardy, 1949)
- Eudorylas uki Kuznetzov, 1990
- Eudorylas umbrinus (Loew, 1858)
- Eudorylas unanimus (Hardy, 1949)
- Eudorylas unicolor (Zetterstedt, 1844)
- Eudorylas venezuelensis Rafael, 1995
- Eudorylas venturai Kehlmaier, 2005
- Eudorylas vicarius (Hardy, 1949)
- Eudorylas vicinus Kozánek, 1992
- Eudorylas vidali Rafael, 1995
- Eudorylas vierecki (Malloch, 1912)
- Eudorylas vineti Dempewolf, 1996
- Eudorylas vonderdunki Dempewolf, 1998
- Eudorylas wahisi De Meyer, 1997
- Eudorylas willistoni (Kertész, 1900)
- Eudorylas wittei (Hardy, 1950)
- Eudorylas wygodzinskyi Rafael, 1995
- Eudorylas youngi (Rafael, 1996)
- Eudorylas yunnanensis Yang & Xu, 1998
- Eudorylas zaitzevi Kuznetzov, 1993
- Eudorylas zanclus Rafael, 1993
- Eudorylas zermattensis (Becker, 1897)
- Eudorylas zonatus (Zetterstedt, 1849)
- Eudorylas zonellus Collin, 1956
