= Dorylomorpha =

Scientific classification
- Kingdom: Animalia
- Phylum: Arthropoda
- Clade: Pancrustacea
- Class: Insecta
- Order: Diptera
- Family: Pipunculidae
- Subfamily: Pipunculinae
- Tribe: Tomosvaryellini
- Genus: Dorylomorpha; Aczél, 1939

Type species
- Pipunculus rufipes Meigen, 1824

Genus of flies

Dorylomorpha is a genus of flies belonging to the family Pipunculidae.

The species of this genus are found in Eurasia and the Americas.

== Species ==
- Dorylomorpha abdochaetus Kapoor, Grewal & Sharma, 1987
- Dorylomorpha abdoflavus Kapoor, Grewal & Sharma, 1987
- Dorylomorpha aberrans Albrecht, 1990
- Dorylomorpha aczeli Hardy, 1947
- Dorylomorpha alaskensis Albrecht, 1990
- Dorylomorpha albitarsis (Zetterstedt, 1844)
- Dorylomorpha albrechti Kuznetzov, 1993
- Dorylomorpha amurensis Albrecht, 1990
- Dorylomorpha anderssoni Albrecht, 1979
- Dorylomorpha appendiculata Kapoor, Grewal & Sharma, 1987
- Dorylomorpha asiatica Kuznetzov, 1992
- Dorylomorpha atramontensis (Banks, 1911)
- Dorylomorpha beckeri (Aczél, 1939)
- Dorylomorpha borealis (Wahlgren, 1910)
- Dorylomorpha burmanica Albrecht, 1990
- Dorylomorpha canadensis Hardy, 1943
- Dorylomorpha caudelli (Malloch, 1912)
- Dorylomorpha clavata Albrecht, 1979
- Dorylomorpha clavifemora Coe, 1966
- Dorylomorpha clavipes Kuznetzov, 1993
- Dorylomorpha confracta Kuznetzov, 1993
- Dorylomorpha confusa (Verrall, 1901)
- Dorylomorpha dispar Albrecht, 1990
- Dorylomorpha exilis (Malloch, 1912)
- Dorylomorpha extricata (Collin, 1937)
- Dorylomorpha extricatoides Albrecht, 1990
- Dorylomorpha fennica Albrecht, 1979
- Dorylomorpha flavolateralis Albrecht, 1990
- Dorylomorpha flavomaculata (Hough, 1899)
- Dorylomorpha flavoscutellaris Albrecht, 1990
- Dorylomorpha fulvitarsis Albrecht, 1990
- Dorylomorpha hackmani Albrecht, 1979
- Dorylomorpha haemorrhoidalis (Zetterstedt, 1838)
- Dorylomorpha hardyi Albrecht, 1990
- Dorylomorpha hungarica (Aczél, 1939)
- Dorylomorpha imparata (Collin, 1937)
- Dorylomorpha improvisa Albrecht, 1990
- Dorylomorpha incognita (Verrall, 1901)
- Dorylomorpha indica Albrecht, 1990
- Dorylomorpha infirmata (Collin, 1937)
- Dorylomorpha insulana Kuznetzov, 1993
- Dorylomorpha kambaitiensis Albrecht, 1990
- Dorylomorpha karelica Albrecht, 1979
- Dorylomorpha koreana Albrecht, 1990
- Dorylomorpha kurodakensis Morakote & Yano, 1990
- Dorylomorpha kuznetzovi Kuznetzova, 1992
- Dorylomorpha laeta (Becker, 1900)
- Dorylomorpha laticlavia Kuznetzov, 1993
- Dorylomorpha latifrons Hardy, 1972
- Dorylomorpha lautereri Albrecht, 1990
- Dorylomorpha lenkoi Hardy, 1965
- Dorylomorpha maculata (Walker, 1834)
- Dorylomorpha malaisei Albrecht, 1990
- Dorylomorpha mongolorum Kuznetzov, 1992
- Dorylomorpha montivaga (Hardy, 1943)
- Dorylomorpha neglecta Albrecht, 1990
- Dorylomorpha occidens (Hardy, 1939)
- Dorylomorpha onegensis Albrecht, 1990
- Dorylomorpha orientalis Albrecht, 1990
- Dorylomorpha platystylis Albrecht, 1979
- Dorylomorpha praetermissa Albrecht, 1979
- Dorylomorpha rectitermina Morakote & Yano, 1990
- Dorylomorpha reveloi Hardy, 1962
- Dorylomorpha rufipes (Meigen, 1824)
- Dorylomorpha sachalinensis Albrecht, 1990
- Dorylomorpha semiclavata Albrecht, 1990
- Dorylomorpha shatalkini Albrecht, 1990
- Dorylomorpha similis Albrecht, 1990
- Dorylomorpha simplex Albrecht, 1990
- Dorylomorpha sinensis Xu & Yang, 1991
- Dorylomorpha spinosa Albrecht, 1979
- Dorylomorpha spinulosa Kuznetzov, 1993
- Dorylomorpha stelviana Kehlmaier, 2008
- Dorylomorpha stenozona Hardy, 1972
- Dorylomorpha subclavata Albrecht, 1990
- Dorylomorpha tanasijtshuki Albrecht, 1990
- Dorylomorpha translucens (Meijere, 1914)
- Dorylomorpha tridentata Hardy, 1943
- Dorylomorpha ussuriana Kuznetzov, 1993
- Dorylomorpha valida Morakote & Yano, 1990
- Dorylomorpha xanthocera (Kowarz, 1887)
- Dorylomorpha xanthopus (Thomson, 1870)
- Dorylomorpha yamagishii Morakote & Yano, 1990
- Dorylomorpha yanoi Morakote & Yano, 1990
