= Pipunculus campestris =

Scientific classification
- Kingdom: Animalia
- Phylum: Arthropoda
- Clade: Pancrustacea
- Class: Insecta
- Order: Diptera
- Family: Pipunculidae
- Subfamily: Pipunculinae
- Tribe: Pipunculini
- Genus: Pipunculus
- Species: P. campestris

Binomial name
- Pipunculus campestris Latreille, 1805

Synonyms
- Musca cephalotes Bosc d'Antic, 1792; Pipunculus ater Meigen, 1824; Pipunculus dentipes Meigen, 1838; Pipunculus dispar Zetterstedt, 1838; Pipunculus spinipes Meigen, 1830; Pipunculus thomsoni Becker, 1897

Species of fly

Pipunculus campestris is a species of fly in the family Pipunculidae. It is found in the Palearctic.

== Distribution ==
Europe.
