= Tomosvaryella sylvatica =

Scientific classification
- Kingdom: Animalia
- Phylum: Arthropoda
- Clade: Pancrustacea
- Class: Insecta
- Order: Diptera
- Family: Pipunculidae
- Subfamily: Pipunculinae
- Tribe: Tomosvaryellini
- Genus: Tomosvaryella
- Species: T. sylvatica

Binomial name
- Tomosvaryella sylvatica (Meigen, 1824)

Synonyms
- Pipunculus sylvatica Meigen, 1824; Pipunculus scoparius Cresson, 1911; Pipunculus tangomus Rapp, 1943

Species of fly

Tomosvaryella sylvatica is a species of fly in the family Pipunculidae.

== Distribution ==
North America, Europe.
