= Eudorylas terminalis =

Scientific classification
- Kingdom: Animalia
- Phylum: Arthropoda
- Clade: Pancrustacea
- Class: Insecta
- Order: Diptera
- Family: Pipunculidae
- Subfamily: Pipunculinae
- Tribe: Eudorylini
- Genus: Eudorylas
- Species: E. terminalis

Binomial name
- Eudorylas terminalis (Thomson, 1870)

Synonyms
- Pipunculus terminalis Thomson, 1870

Species of fly

Eudorylas terminalis is a species of fly in the family Pipunculidae.

== Distribution ==
Austria, Belgium, Great Britain, Bulgaria, Corsica, Croatia, Czech Republic, Denmark, Finland, France, Germany, Hungary, Italy, Latvia, Poland, Slovakia, Spain, Sweden, Switzerland, Netherlands.
