= Eudorylas kowarzi =

Scientific classification
- Kingdom: Animalia
- Phylum: Arthropoda
- Clade: Pancrustacea
- Class: Insecta
- Order: Diptera
- Family: Pipunculidae
- Subfamily: Pipunculinae
- Tribe: Eudorylini
- Genus: Eudorylas
- Species: E. kowarzi

Binomial name
- Eudorylas kowarzi (Becker, 1897)

Synonyms
- Pipunculus kowarzi Becker, 1897; Eudorylas dissimilis Coe, 1966

Species of fly

Eudorylas kowarzi is a species of fly in the family Pipunculidae.

== Distribution ==
Belgium, Germany, Great Britain, Croatia, Hungary, Poland, Slovakia, Netherlands.
