= Cephalosphaera (fly) =

Scientific classification
- Kingdom: Animalia
- Phylum: Arthropoda
- Class: Insecta
- Order: Diptera
- Family: Pipunculidae
- Subfamily: Pipunculinae
- Tribe: Cephalopsini
- Genus: Cephalosphaera; Enderlein, 1936

Type species
- Pipunculus furcata Egger, 1860

Synonyms
- Prothechus Rondani, 1856; Prothecus Rondani, 1856; Strandimyza Duda, 1940

Genus of insects

Cephalosphaera is a genus of flies belonging to the family Pipunculidae.

== Species ==
- Cephalosphaera acuminata (Cresson, 1911)
- Cephalosphaera aequatorialis (Becker, 1919)
- Cephalosphaera amboinalis (Walker, 1860)
- Cephalosphaera appendiculata (Cresson, 1911)
- Cephalosphaera arnaudi Rafael, 1992
- †Cephalosphaera baltica Carpenter & Hull, 1939
- Cephalosphaera biscaynei (Cresson, 1912)
- Cephalosphaera boutropis (Hardy, 1965)
- Cephalosphaera brevis (Cresson, 1911)
- Cephalosphaera collarti (Hardy, 1952)
- Cephalosphaera cristata Rafael, 1992
- Cephalosphaera eukrenaina Skevington, 1999
- Cephalosphaera fairchildi Rafael, 1992
- Cephalosphaera filicera (De Meyer, 1990)
- Cephalosphaera furcata (Egger, 1860)
- Cephalosphaera germanica Aczél, 1940
- Cephalosphaera guanacastensis Rafael & Menezes, 1999
- Cephalosphaera gymne De Meyer & Grootaert, 1990
- Cephalosphaera hikosanus (Morakote, 1990)
- Cephalosphaera hirashimai (Morakote, 1990)
- Cephalosphaera honshuensis (Morakote, 1990)
- Cephalosphaera immodica De Meyer & Grootaert, 1990
- Cephalosphaera incomitata (Hardy, 1965)
- Cephalosphaera insularis Rafael, 1996
- Cephalosphaera inusitata (Hardy, 1972)
- Cephalosphaera jamaicensis (Johnson, 1919)
- Cephalosphaera kasparjani (Kuznetzov, 1990)
- Cephalosphaera macroctenia Rafael, 1992
- Cephalosphaera magnispinosus (Hardy, 1950)
- Cephalosphaera maxima Hardy, 1943
- Cephalosphaera miriamae Rafael, 1992
- Cephalosphaera mocaensis (Hardy, 1948)
- Cephalosphaera motichoorensis (Kapoor, Grewal & Sharma, 1987)
- Cephalosphaera pacaraima Rafael & Rosa, 1992
- Cephalosphaera pallidifemoralis (Hardy, 1952)
- Cephalosphaera parthenopipis Skevington, 1999
- Cephalosphaera patula (Hardy, 1972)
- Cephalosphaera petila Skevington, 1999
- Cephalosphaera prionotaina Skevington, 1999
- Cephalosphaera procera Rafael & Menezes, 1999
- Cephalosphaera reducta (De Meyer, 1990)
- Cephalosphaera redunca (Hardy, 1972)
- Cephalosphaera santiagoensis Rafael, 1992
- Cephalosphaera sapporoensis (Morakote, 1990)
- Cephalosphaera semispiralis Rafael & Rosa, 1992
- Cephalosphaera sylvana (Brunetti, 1927)
- Cephalosphaera tingens (Hardy, 1972)
- Cephalosphaera vietnamensis (Hardy, 1972)
- Cephalosphaera wauensis De Meyer & Grootaert, 1990
- Cephalosphaera xanthosternum (Hardy, 1968)
- Cephalosphaera zumbadoi Rafael & Menezes, 1999
