= Dasydorylas horridus =

Scientific classification
- Kingdom: Animalia
- Phylum: Arthropoda
- Clade: Pancrustacea
- Class: Insecta
- Order: Diptera
- Family: Pipunculidae
- Subfamily: Pipunculinae
- Tribe: Eudorylini
- Genus: Dasydorylas
- Species: D. horridus

Binomial name
- Dasydorylas horridus (Becker, 1897)

Synonyms
- Pipunculus horridus Becker, 1897

Species of fly

Dasydorylas horridus is a species of fly in the family Pipunculidae.

== Distribution ==
Croatia, Hungary, Great Britain.
