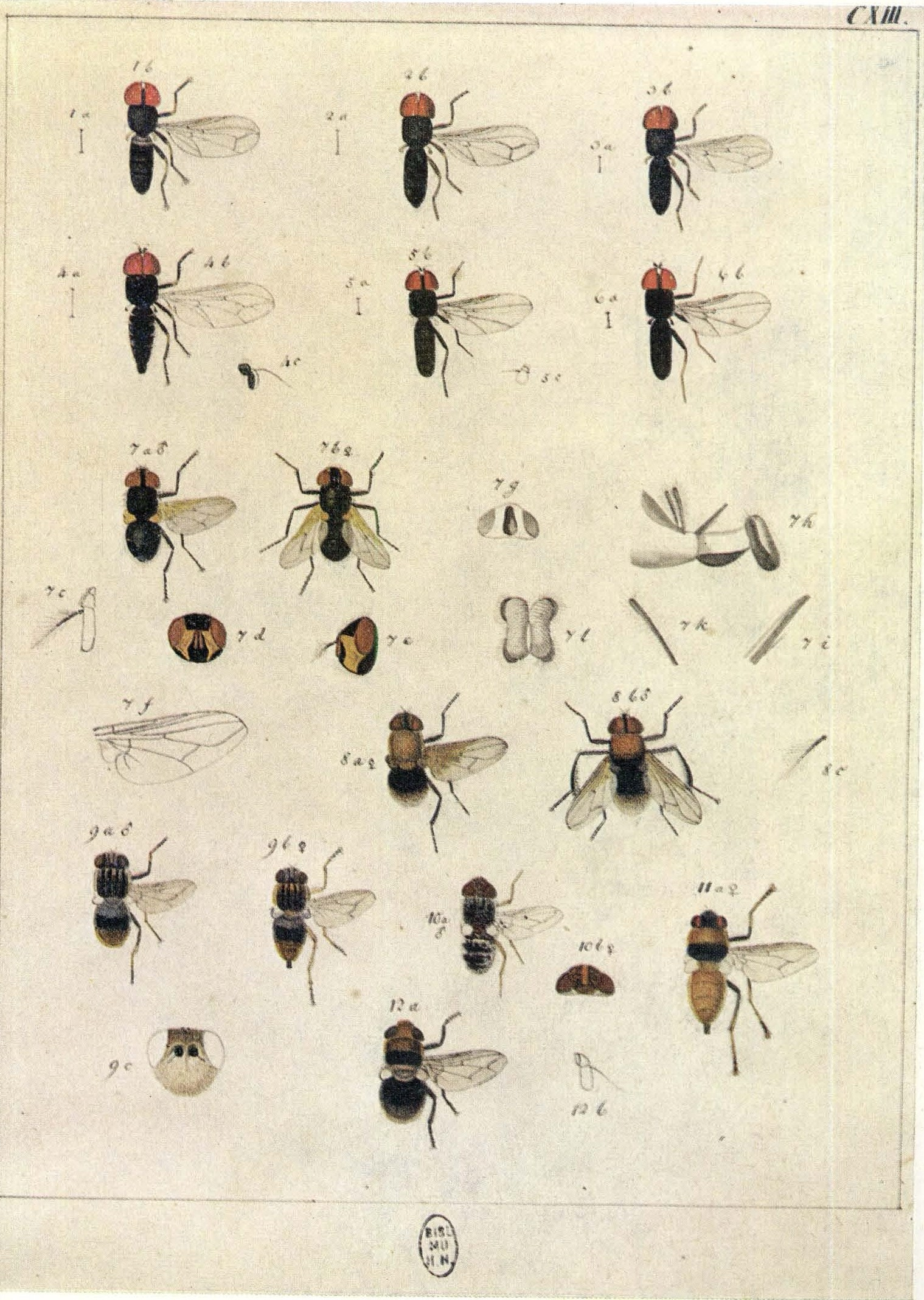
- Chalarus spurius depicted in Europäischen Zweiflügeligen (figure 6)

Scientific classification
- Kingdom: Animalia
- Phylum: Arthropoda
- Clade: Pancrustacea
- Class: Insecta
- Order: Diptera
- Superfamily: Syrphoidea
- Family: Pipunculidae
- Subfamily: Chalarinae
- Genus: Chalarus; Walker, 1834

Type species
- Cephalops spurius Fallén, 1816

Synonyms
- Atelenevra Macquart, 1834; Ateleonevra Agassiz, 1846; Chalurus Rossi, 1849; Ateleneura Bezzi, 1907; Charlarus Hardy, 1943

= Chalarus =

Genus of insects

Chalarus is a genus of flies belonging to the family Pipunculidae.

The genus has cosmopolitan distribution.

== Species ==
- Chalarus absonus Rafael, 1990
- Chalarus amazonensis Rafael, 1988
- Chalarus angustifrons Morakote, 1990
- Chalarus argenteus Coe, 1966
- Chalarus basalis Loew, 1873
- Chalarus beijingensis Yang & Xu, 1998
- Chalarus brevicaudis Jervis, 1992
- Chalarus chilensis Collin, 1931
- Chalarus clarus Jervis, 1992
- Chalarus connexus Rafael, 1988
- Chalarus decorus Jervis, 1992
- Chalarus delicatus Rafael, 1990
- Chalarus elegantulus Jervis, 1992
- Chalarus exiguus (Haliday, 1833)
- Chalarus fimbriatus Coe, 1966
- Chalarus flosculus Morakote, 1990
- Chalarus griseus Coe, 1966
- Chalarus gynocephalus Jervis, 1992
- Chalarus holosericeus (Meigen, 1824)
- Chalarus immanus Kehlmaier, 2008
- Chalarus indistinctus Jervis, 1992
- Chalarus irwini Skevington & Kehlmaier, 2008
- Chalarus juliae Jervis, 1992
- Chalarus latifrons Hardy, 1943
- Chalarus lenkoi Rafael, 1990
- Chalarus leticiae Kehlmaier, 2003
- Chalarus longicaudis Jervis, 1992
- Chalarus magnalus Morakote, 1990
- Chalarus marki Kehlmaier, 2008
- Chalarus orientalis Jervis, 1985
- Chalarus parmenteri Coe, 1966
- Chalarus perplexus Jervis, 1992
- Chalarus polychaetus Huo & Yang, 2011
- Chalarus proprius Jervis, 1992
- Chalarus pughi Coe, 1966
- Chalarus rectifrons Morakote, 1990
- Chalarus saxonicus Kehlmaier, 2008
- Chalarus spurius (Fallén, 1816)
- Chalarus trilineatus Jervis, 1985
- Chalarus triramosus Rafael, 1990
- Chalarus unilacertus Morakote, 1990
- Chalarus velutinus (Cresson, 1911)
- Chalarus xanthopodus Rafael, 1990
- Chalarus zanganus Yang & Xu, 1987
- Chalarus zlobini Kuznetzov, 1990
- Chalarus zyginae Jervis, 1992
