= Karl Ludwig Friedrich von Roser =

Karl Ludwig Friedrich von Roser (1787–1861) was a German entomologist who specialised in Diptera. His main career was as a high ranking government official and administrator in the Kingdom of Württemberg.

Born in Vaihingen an der Enz, where his father held the position of Oberamtmann, Roser was educated at a gymnasium in Stuttgart and at the University of Tübingen. As an entomologist, he described many new Diptera species in his Erster Nachtrag zu dem im Jahre 1834 bekannt gemachten Verzeichnisse in Württtemberg vorkommender zweiflügliger Insekten (1840).

He died in Stuttgart.
