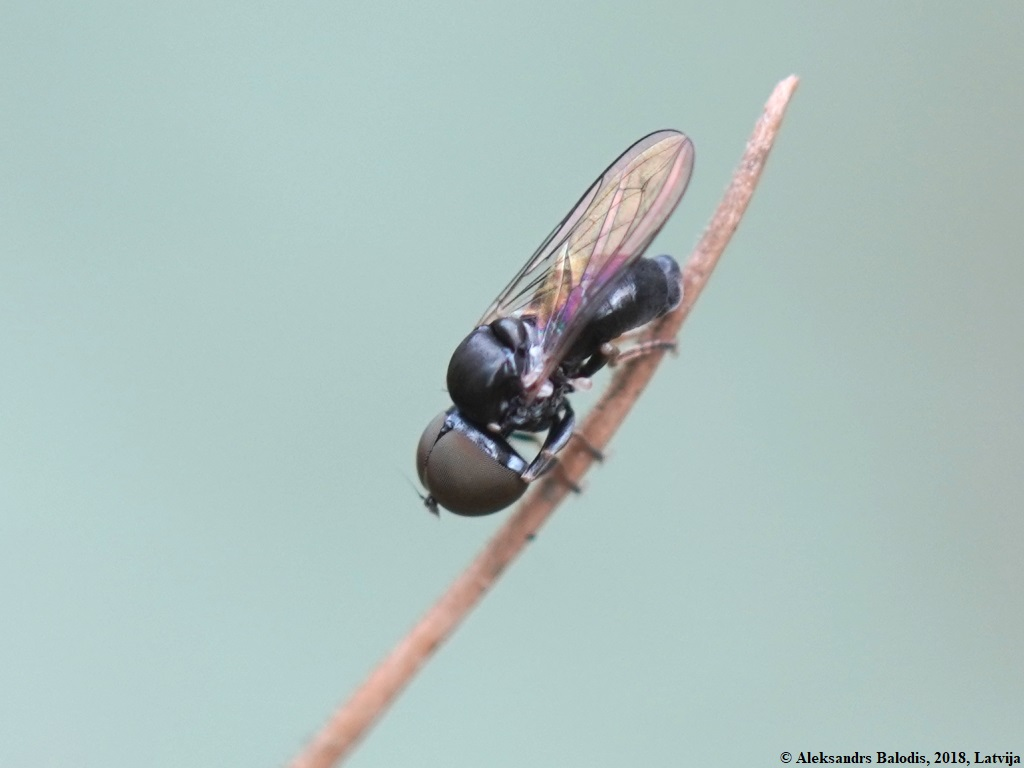
- Tomosvaryella sp.

Scientific classification
- Kingdom: Animalia
- Phylum: Arthropoda
- Clade: Pancrustacea
- Class: Insecta
- Order: Diptera
- Family: Pipunculidae
- Subfamily: Pipunculinae
- Tribe: Tomosvaryellini
- Genus: Tomosvaryella; Aczél, 1939

Type species
- Pipunculus sylvaticus Meigen, 1824

Diversity
- at least 280 species

Synonyms
- Alloneura Rondani, 1856; Adella Kuznetzov, 1995

= Tomosvaryella =

Genus of flies

Tomosvaryella is a genus of big-headed flies (insects in the family Pipunculidae).

== See also ==
- List of Tomosvaryella species
