= Tomosvaryellini =

Scientific classification
- Domain: Eukaryota
- Kingdom: Animalia
- Phylum: Arthropoda
- Class: Insecta
- Order: Diptera
- Family: Pipunculidae
- Subfamily: Pipunculinae
- Tribe: Tomosvaryellini

Subfamily of flies

Tomosvaryellini is a tribe of big-headed flies (insects in the family Pipunculidae).

== Genera ==
- Dorylomorpha Aczél, 1939
- Tomosvaryella Aczél, 1939
