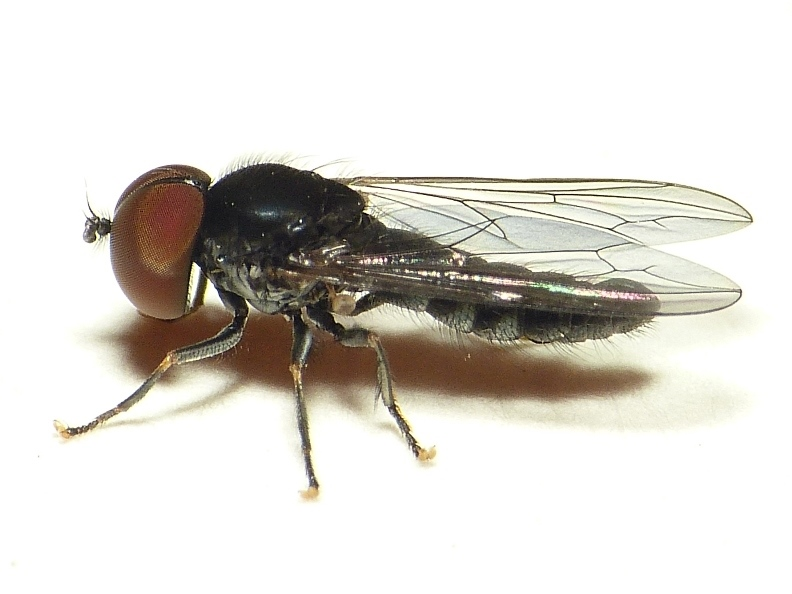
- Verrallia aucta Netherlands

Scientific classification
- Domain: Eukaryota
- Kingdom: Animalia
- Phylum: Arthropoda
- Class: Insecta
- Order: Diptera
- Family: Pipunculidae
- Subfamily: Chalarinae

= Chalarinae =

Subfamily of flies

Chalarinae is a subfamily of big-headed flies (insects in the family Pipunculidae).

== Genera ==
- Genus Chalarus Walker, 1834
- Genus Jassidophaga Aczél, 1939
- Genus †Protoverrallia Aczél, 1948 Baltic amber Eocene (Priabonian)
- Genus Verrallia Mik, 1899
