= Liepana lugubris =

Scientific classification
- Kingdom: Animalia
- Phylum: Arthropoda
- Clade: Pancrustacea
- Class: Insecta
- Order: Diptera
- Family: Tephritidae
- Subfamily: Tephritinae
- Tribe: Dithrycini
- Genus: Liepana
- Species: L. lugubris

Binomial name
- Liepana lugubris (Macquart, 1847)

Synonyms
- Tephritis lugubris Macquart, 1847

Species of fly

Liepana lugubris is a species of tephritid or fruit flies in the genus Hendrella of the family Tephritidae.

== Distribution ==
Australia.
