= Liepana helichrysii =

Scientific classification
- Kingdom: Animalia
- Phylum: Arthropoda
- Clade: Pancrustacea
- Class: Insecta
- Order: Diptera
- Family: Tephritidae
- Subfamily: Tephritinae
- Tribe: Dithrycini
- Genus: Liepana
- Species: L. helichrysii

Binomial name
- Liepana helichrysii Hardy & Drew, 1996

Species of fly

Liepana helichrysii is a species of tephritid or fruit flies in the genus Hendrella of the family Tephritidae.

== Distribution ==
Australia.
