= Chejuparia =

Scientific classification
- Kingdom: Animalia
- Phylum: Arthropoda
- Class: Insecta
- Order: Diptera
- Family: Tephritidae
- Genus: Chejuparia; Kwon, 1985
- Species: C. pibari

Binomial name
- Chejuparia pibari Kwon, 1985

Genus of fruit flies

Chejuparia is a genus of fruit flies containing the single species, Chejuparia pibari. It fits near other Eurasian Tephritidae such as Oedaspis schatchi, Oedaspis wolongata, and Oedaspis fini, differing in details of wing pattern.

It was initially described as Oedaspis pibari but is currently included in the genus Chejuparia.

It is found in South Korea.
