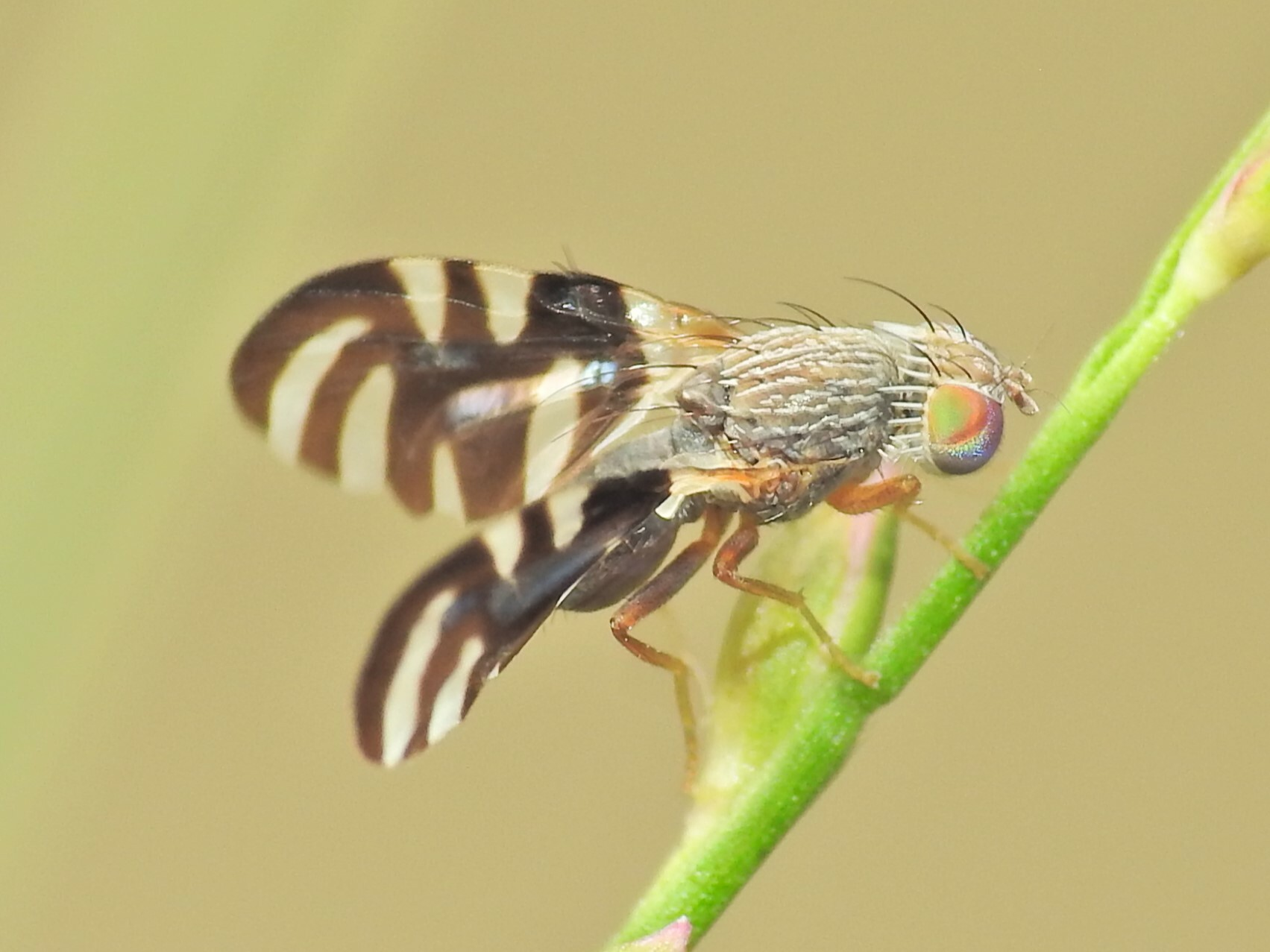

Scientific classification
- Kingdom: Animalia
- Phylum: Arthropoda
- Clade: Pancrustacea
- Class: Insecta
- Order: Diptera
- Family: Tephritidae
- Subfamily: Tephritinae
- Tribe: Dithrycini
- Subtribe: Platensinina
- Genus: Oedaspis
- Species: O. australis

Binomial name
- Oedaspis australis (Malloch, 1939)

Synonyms
- Tephrella australis Malloch, 1939

= Oedaspis australis =

Species of fly

Oedaspis australis is a species of tephritid or fruit fly in the family Tephritidae.

== Distribution ==
Papua New Guinea, Australia.
