= Valentibulla thurmanae =

Scientific classification
- Kingdom: Animalia
- Phylum: Arthropoda
- Class: Insecta
- Order: Diptera
- Family: Tephritidae
- Subfamily: Tephritinae
- Tribe: Dithrycini
- Genus: Valentibulla
- Species: V. thurmanae

Binomial name
- Valentibulla thurmanae Foote & Blanc, 1959

Species of fly

Valentibulla thurmanae is a species of tephritid or fruit flies in the genus Valentibulla of the family Tephritidae.

== Distribution ==
United States.
