= Aciurina mexicana =

Scientific classification
- Kingdom: Animalia
- Phylum: Arthropoda
- Class: Insecta
- Order: Diptera
- Family: Tephritidae
- Subfamily: Tephritinae
- Tribe: Dithrycini
- Genus: Aciurina
- Species: A. mexicana

Binomial name
- Aciurina mexicana (Aczél, 1953)

Synonyms
- Tephrella mexicana Aczél, 1953

Species of fly

Aciurina mexicana is a species of tephritid or fruit flies in the genus Aciurina of the family Tephritidae.

== Distribution ==
United States, Mexico.
