= T. californica =

T. californica may refer to:

- Torpedo californica, the Pacific electric ray, a fish species endemic to the coastal waters of the northeastern Pacific Ocean from Baja California to British Columbia
- Torreya californica, a conifer species endemic to California
- Trixis californica, the American threefold, a perennial shrub species found in the southwestern United States in the states of California, Arizona, New Mexico and Texas, and also in Mexico in the states of Baja California, Chihuahua, Coahuila, Durango, Nuevo León, Sinaloa, Sonora, Tamaulipas and Zacatecas
- Trypeta californica, a fruit fly species

== Synonyms ==
- Triakis californica, a synonym for Triakis semifasciata, the leopard shark, a fish species found along the Pacific coast of North America from Oregon to Mazatlán in Mexico

== See also ==
- List of Latin and Greek words commonly used in systematic names#C
