= Hendrella sordida =

Scientific classification
- Kingdom: Animalia
- Phylum: Arthropoda
- Class: Insecta
- Order: Diptera
- Family: Tephritidae
- Subfamily: Tephritinae
- Tribe: Dithrycini
- Genus: Hendrella
- Species: H. sordida

Binomial name
- Hendrella sordida Korneyev, 1989

Species of fly

Hendrella sordida is a species of tephritid or fruit flies in the genus Hendrella of the family Tephritidae.

== Distribution ==
Kyrgyzstan.
