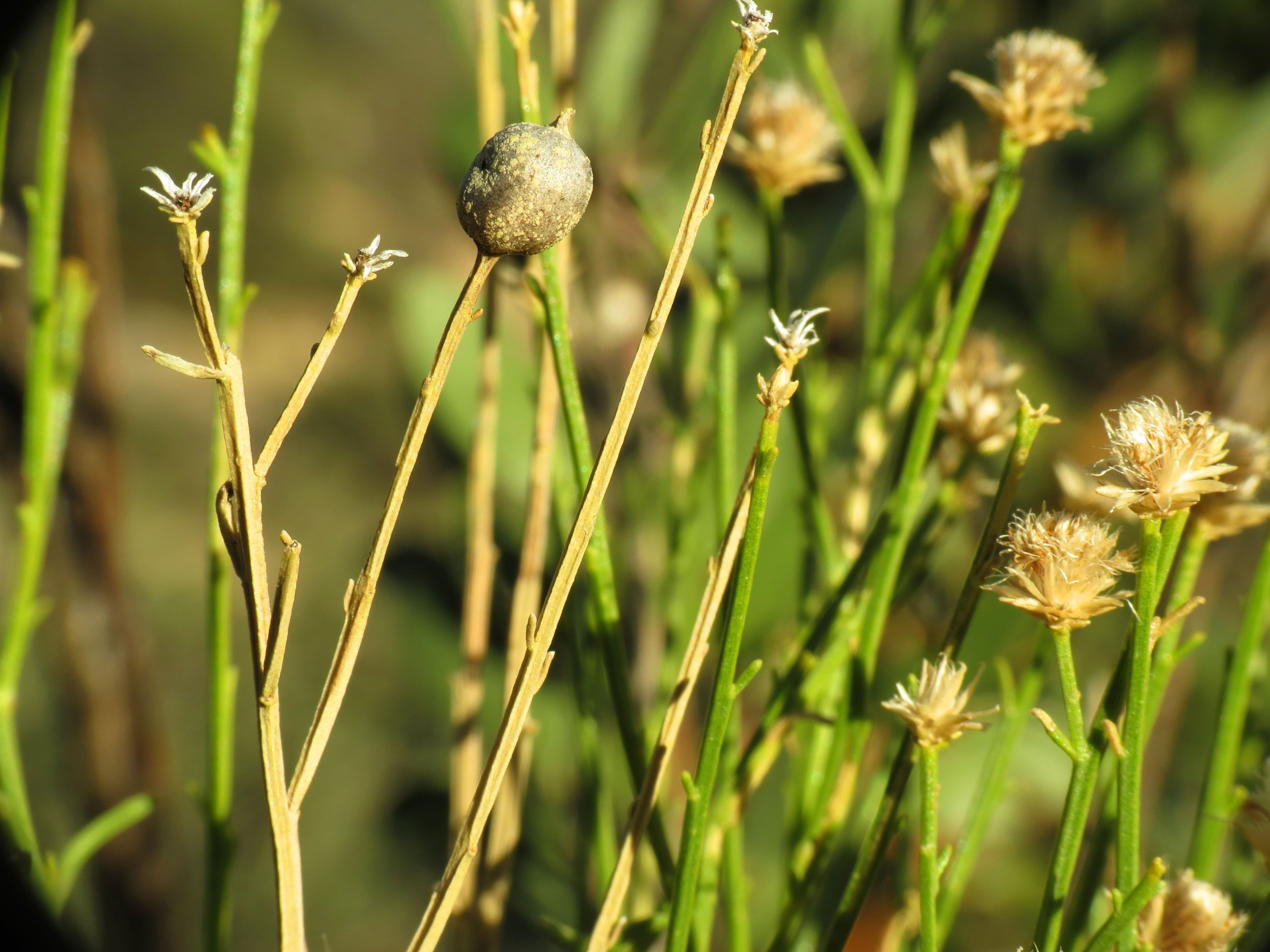
- Desert Broom Gall formed by Aciurina thoracica

Scientific classification
- Kingdom: Animalia
- Phylum: Arthropoda
- Clade: Pancrustacea
- Class: Insecta
- Order: Diptera
- Family: Tephritidae
- Subfamily: Tephritinae
- Tribe: Dithrycini
- Genus: Aciurina
- Species: A. thoracica

Binomial name
- Aciurina thoracica Curran, 1932

= Aciurina thoracica =

Species of fly

Aciurina thoracica is a species of tephritid or fruit flies in the genus Aciurina of the family Tephritidae. It induces galls on plants from the genus Baccharis.

== Distribution ==
United States, Mexico.
