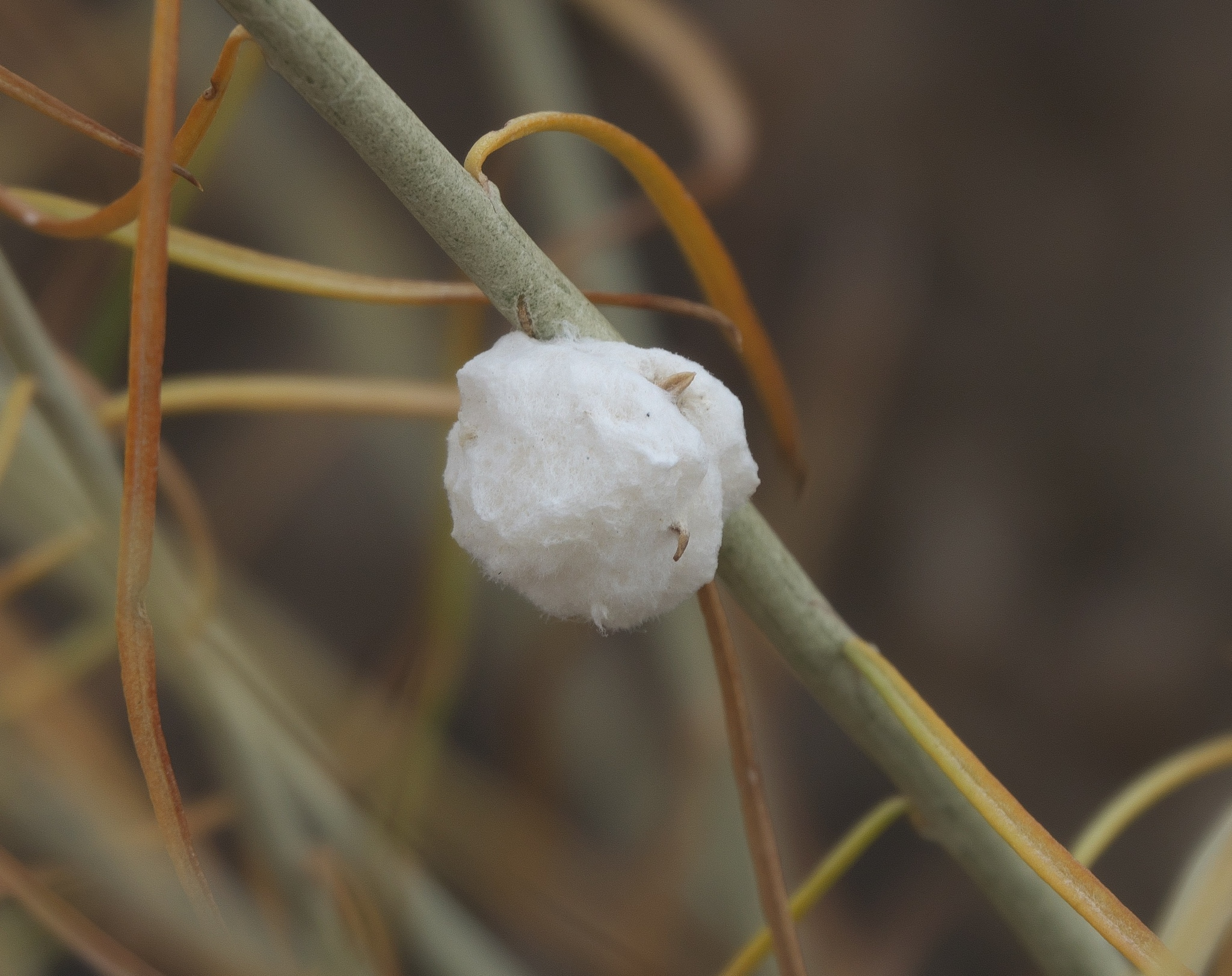
- Aciurina bigeloviae, New Mexico

Scientific classification
- Kingdom: Animalia
- Phylum: Arthropoda
- Class: Insecta
- Order: Diptera
- Family: Tephritidae
- Tribe: Dithrycini
- Genus: Aciurina
- Species: A. bigeloviae

Binomial name
- Aciurina bigeloviae (Cockerell, 1890)

Synonyms
- Eurosta bigeloviae Townsend, 1893; Trypeta bigeloviae Cockerell, 1890; Trypeta bigeloviae var. disrupta Cockerell, 1890; Trypeta disrupta Cockerell, 1890

= Aciurina bigeloviae =

Species of fly

Aciurina bigeloviae is a species of tephritid or fruit flies in the genus Aciurina of the family Tephritidae. It induces galls by laying an egg on the bud of a Ericameria nauseosa plant, which forms a gall that the larvae develops within through the fall.

== Distribution ==
Canada, United States.
