= Valentibulla munda =

Scientific classification
- Kingdom: Animalia
- Phylum: Arthropoda
- Class: Insecta
- Order: Diptera
- Family: Tephritidae
- Subfamily: Tephritinae
- Tribe: Dithrycini
- Genus: Valentibulla
- Species: V. munda

Binomial name
- Valentibulla munda (Coquillett, 1899)

Synonyms
- Euaresta munda Coquillett, 1899; Tephrella euarestoides Bates, 1935Bates, 1935

Species of fly

Valentibulla munda is a species of tephritid or fruit flies in the genus Valentibulla of the family Tephritidae.

== Distribution ==
Canada, United States.
