= Oedaspis multifasciata =

Scientific classification
- Kingdom: Animalia
- Phylum: Arthropoda
- Clade: Pancrustacea
- Class: Insecta
- Order: Diptera
- Family: Tephritidae
- Subfamily: Tephritinae
- Tribe: Dithrycini
- Subtribe: Platensinina
- Genus: Oedaspis
- Species: O. multifasciata

Binomial name
- Oedaspis multifasciata (Loew, 1862)

Synonyms
- Trypeta multifasciata Loew, 1862

Species of fly

Oedaspis multifasciata is a species of tephritid or fruit flies in the genus Oedaspis of the family Tephritidae.

== Distribution ==
France, Germany, Spain, Austria, Italy, Ukraine.
