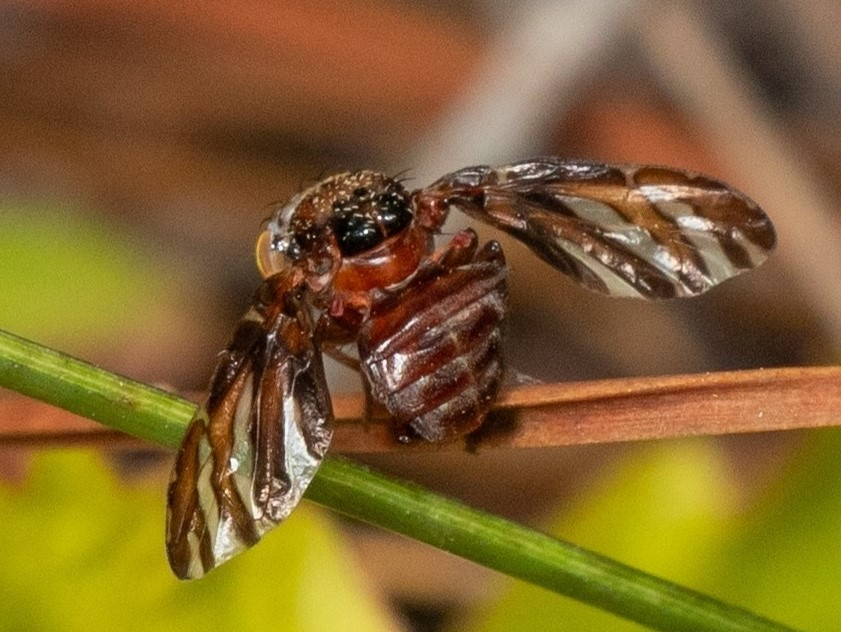

Scientific classification
- Kingdom: Animalia
- Phylum: Arthropoda
- Class: Insecta
- Order: Diptera
- Family: Tephritidae
- Subfamily: Tephritinae
- Tribe: Dithrycini
- Genus: Peronyma
- Species: P. quadrifasciata

Binomial name
- Peronyma quadrifasciata (Macquart, 1843)

Synonyms
- Tephritis quadrifasciata Macquart, 1843; Tomoplagina maculata Curran, 1932; Trypeta sarcinata Loew, 1862

= Peronyma quadrifasciata =

Species of fly

Peronyma quadrifasciata is a species of tephritid or fruit flies in the family Tephritidae.

== Distribution ==
United States.
