= Oedoncus taenipalpis =

Scientific classification
- Kingdom: Animalia
- Phylum: Arthropoda
- Class: Insecta
- Order: Diptera
- Family: Tephritidae
- Subfamily: Tephritinae
- Tribe: Dithrycini
- Genus: Oedoncus
- Species: O. taenipalpis

Binomial name
- Oedoncus taenipalpis Speiser, 1924

Synonyms
- Rhynchoedaspis munroana Bezzi, 1924

Species of fly

Oedoncus taenipalpis is a species of tephritid or fruit flies in the genus Oedoncus of the family Tephritidae.

== Distribution ==
Tanzania, Malawi, Zimbabwe, Mozambique, South Africa.
