= Dithryca guttulosa =

Scientific classification
- Kingdom: Animalia
- Phylum: Arthropoda
- Class: Insecta
- Order: Diptera
- Family: Tephritidae
- Subfamily: Tephritinae
- Tribe: Dithrycini
- Genus: Dithryca
- Species: D. guttulosa

Binomial name
- Dithryca guttulosa Loew, 1869

Synonyms
- Carphotricha andrieuxi Tavares, 1901; Carphotricha guttulosa Loew, 1869

Species of fly

Dithryca guttulosa is a species of tephritid or fruit flies in the genus Dithryca of the family Tephritidae.

== Distribution ==
Spain, Portugal.
