= Xenodorella mira =

Scientific classification
- Kingdom: Animalia
- Phylum: Arthropoda
- Class: Insecta
- Order: Diptera
- Family: Tephritidae
- Subfamily: Tephritinae
- Tribe: Dithrycini
- Genus: Xenodorella
- Species: X. mira

Binomial name
- Xenodorella mira Munro, 1967

Species of fly

Xenodorella mira is a species of tephritid or fruit flies in the genus Xenodorella of the family Tephritidae.

== Distribution ==
Namibia.
