= Hendrella caloptera =

Scientific classification
- Kingdom: Animalia
- Phylum: Arthropoda
- Class: Insecta
- Order: Diptera
- Family: Tephritidae
- Subfamily: Tephritinae
- Tribe: Dithrycini
- Genus: Hendrella
- Species: H. caloptera

Binomial name
- Hendrella caloptera Loew, 1850

Synonyms
- Trypeta caloptera Loew, 1850

Species of fly

Hendrella caloptera is a species of tephritid or fruit flies in the genus Hendrella of the family Tephritidae.

== Distribution ==
Kazakhstan, Siberia, Turkmenistan, Mongolia & China.
