= Hendrella variegata =

Scientific classification
- Kingdom: Animalia
- Phylum: Arthropoda
- Class: Insecta
- Order: Diptera
- Family: Tephritidae
- Subfamily: Tephritinae
- Tribe: Dithrycini
- Genus: Hendrella
- Species: H. variegata

Binomial name
- Hendrella variegata Radhakrishnan, 1984

Species of fly

Hendrella variegata is a species of tephritid or fruit flies in the genus Hendrella of the family Tephritidae.

== Distribution ==
India.
