= Oedaspis fissa =

Scientific classification
- Kingdom: Animalia
- Phylum: Arthropoda
- Clade: Pancrustacea
- Class: Insecta
- Order: Diptera
- Family: Tephritidae
- Subfamily: Tephritinae
- Tribe: Dithrycini
- Subtribe: Platensinina
- Genus: Oedaspis
- Species: O. fissa

Binomial name
- Oedaspis fissa Loew, 1862

Species of fly

Oedaspis fissa is a species of tephritid or fruit flies in the genus Oedaspis of the family Tephritidae.

== Distribution ==
Spain.
