= Aciurina maculata =

Scientific classification
- Kingdom: Animalia
- Phylum: Arthropoda
- Class: Insecta
- Order: Diptera
- Family: Tephritidae
- Subfamily: Tephritinae
- Tribe: Dithrycini
- Genus: Aciurina
- Species: A. maculata

Binomial name
- Aciurina maculata (Cole, 1919)

Synonyms
- Aciura maculata Cole, 1919; Aciurina pacifica Curran, 1932

Species of fly

Aciurina maculata is a species of tephritid or fruit flies in the genus Aciurina of the family Tephritidae.

== Distribution ==
United States.
