= Oedaspis =

Scientific classification
- Kingdom: Animalia
- Phylum: Arthropoda
- Class: Insecta
- Order: Diptera
- Family: Tephritidae
- Subfamily: Tephritinae
- Tribe: Dithrycini
- Subtribe: Platensinina
- Genus: Oedaspis; Loew, 1862

Type species
- Trypeta multifasciata Loew, 1850

Synonyms
- Chrysotrypanea Malloch, 1939; Dichoedaspis Hendel, 1927; Embaspis Munro, 1952; Melanoedaspis Hendel, 1927; Munroedaspis Hering, 1940; Oedaspoides Hendel, 1927; Tylaspis Munro, 1935

Genus of flies

Oedaspis is a genus of tephritid or fruit flies in the family Tephritidae.

== Species ==
- Oedaspis amani Freidberg & Kaplan, 1992
- Oedaspis apicalis Hardy & Drew, 1996
- Oedaspis australis (Malloch, 1939)
- Oedaspis austrina Hardy & Drew, 1996
- Oedaspis chinensis Bezzi, 1920
- Oedaspis congoensis Freidberg & Kaplan, 1992
- Oedaspis continua Hardy & Drew, 1996
- Oedaspis crocea Munro, 1939
- Oedaspis daphnea Séguy, 1930
- Oedaspis dichotoma Loew, 1869
- Oedaspis dorsocentralis Zia, 1938
- Oedaspis escheri Bezzi, 1910
- Oedaspis farinosa Hendel, 1927
- Oedaspis fini Freidberg, 1994
- Oedaspis fissa Loew, 1862
- Oedaspis formosana Shiraki, 1933
- Oedaspis gallicola Hardy & Drew, 1996
- Oedaspis goodenia Hardy & Drew, 1996
- Oedaspis hardyi Norrbom, 1999
- Oedaspis hyalibasis Freidberg & Kaplan, 1992
- Oedaspis inflata (Munro, 1954)
- Oedaspis japonica Shiraki, 1933
- Oedaspis kaszabi Richter, 1973
- Oedaspis maraisi Munro, 1935
- Oedaspis meissneri Hering, 1938
- Oedaspis mouldsi Hardy & Drew, 1996
- Oedaspis multifasciata (Loew, 1850)
- Oedaspis nyx Freidberg & Kaplan, 1992
- Oedaspis olearia Hardy & Drew, 1996
- Oedaspis ouinensis Hancock, 2008
- Oedaspis pauliani (Munro, 1952)
- Oedaspis perkinsi Hardy & Drew, 1996
- Oedaspis plucheivora Freidberg & Kaplan, 1992
- Oedaspis quinotata (Munro, 1939)
- Oedaspis quinquiefasciata Becker, 1908
- Oedaspis ragdai Hering, 1940
- Oedaspis reducta Freidberg & Kaplan, 1992
- Oedaspis reticulata Freidberg & Kaplan, 1992
- Oedaspis russa Munro, 1935
- Oedaspis schatchi Korneyev, 2002
- Oedaspis semihyalina Hardy & Drew, 1996
- Oedaspis serrata Freidberg & Kaplan, 1992
- Oedaspis trapezoidalis Munro, 1938
- Oedaspis trifasciata (Malloch, 1939)
- Oedaspis trimaculata Hardy & Drew, 1996
- Oedaspis trotteriana Bezzi, 1913
- Oedaspis villeneuvei Bezzi, 1913
- Oedaspis whitei Hardy & Drew, 1996

- Oedaspis apiciclara Hardy & Drew, 1996 was moved to Liepana.
- Oedaspis latifasciata Hering, 1937 is a synonym of Oedaspis fissa Loew, 1862.
