= Aciurina semilucida =

Scientific classification
- Kingdom: Animalia
- Phylum: Arthropoda
- Class: Insecta
- Order: Diptera
- Family: Tephritidae
- Subfamily: Tephritinae
- Tribe: Dithrycini
- Genus: Aciurina
- Species: A. semilucida

Binomial name
- Aciurina semilucida Bates, 1935

Synonyms
- Aciura semilucida Bates, 1935; Tephrella semilucida Bates, 1935; Urophora sabroskyi Steyskal, 1979

Species of fly

Aciurina semilucida is a species of tephritid or fruit flies in the genus Aciurina of the family Tephritidae.

== Distribution ==
United States.
