= Hendrella trimaculata =

Scientific classification
- Kingdom: Animalia
- Phylum: Arthropoda
- Class: Insecta
- Order: Diptera
- Family: Tephritidae
- Subfamily: Tephritinae
- Tribe: Dithrycini
- Genus: Hendrella
- Species: H. trimaculata

Binomial name
- Hendrella trimaculata (Hardy, 1988)

Synonyms
- Tephrella trimaculata Hardy, 1988

Species of fly

Hendrella trimaculata is a species of tephritid or fruit flies in the genus Hendrella of the family Tephritidae.

== Distribution ==
Indonesia.
