= Oedaspis nyx =

Scientific classification
- Kingdom: Animalia
- Phylum: Arthropoda
- Clade: Pancrustacea
- Class: Insecta
- Order: Diptera
- Family: Tephritidae
- Subfamily: Tephritinae
- Tribe: Dithrycini
- Subtribe: Platensinina
- Genus: Oedaspis
- Species: O. nyx

Binomial name
- Oedaspis nyx Freidberg & Kaplan, 1992

Species of fly

Oedaspis nyx is a species of tephritid or fruit flies in the genus Oedaspis of the family Tephritidae.

== Distribution ==
Madagascar.
