= Hendrella basalis =

Scientific classification
- Kingdom: Animalia
- Phylum: Arthropoda
- Class: Insecta
- Order: Diptera
- Family: Tephritidae
- Subfamily: Tephritinae
- Tribe: Dithrycini
- Genus: Hendrella
- Species: H. basalis

Binomial name
- Hendrella basalis (Hendel, 1927)

Synonyms
- Tephrella basalis Hendel, 1927; Tephrella fulvescens Chen, 1938

Species of fly

Hendrella basalis is a species of tephritid or fruit flies in the genus Hendrella of the family Tephritidae.

== Distribution ==
Kazakhstan to East Russia, Mongolia, China.
