= Hendrella winnertzii =

Scientific classification
- Kingdom: Animalia
- Phylum: Arthropoda
- Class: Insecta
- Order: Diptera
- Family: Tephritidae
- Subfamily: Tephritinae
- Tribe: Dithrycini
- Genus: Hendrella
- Species: H. winnertzii

Binomial name
- Hendrella winnertzii (Frauenfeld, 1864)

Synonyms
- Trypeta winnertzii Frauenfeld, 1864

Species of fly

Hendrella winnertzii is a species of tephritid or fruit flies in the genus Hendrella of the family Tephritidae.

== Distribution ==
Ukraine to East Siberia, Mongolia, China.
