= Hendrella ibis =

Scientific classification
- Kingdom: Animalia
- Phylum: Arthropoda
- Class: Insecta
- Order: Diptera
- Family: Tephritidae
- Subfamily: Tephritinae
- Tribe: Dithrycini
- Genus: Hendrella
- Species: H. ibis

Binomial name
- Hendrella ibis (Hendel, 1927)

Synonyms
- Tephrella ibis Hendel, 1927

Species of fly

Hendrella ibis is a species of tephritid or fruit flies in the genus Hendrella of the family Tephritidae.

== Distribution ==
Mongolia, China.
