= Hendrella sinensis =

Scientific classification
- Kingdom: Animalia
- Phylum: Arthropoda
- Class: Insecta
- Order: Diptera
- Family: Tephritidae
- Subfamily: Tephritinae
- Tribe: Dithrycini
- Genus: Hendrella
- Species: H. sinensis

Binomial name
- Hendrella sinensis Wang, 1996

Species of fly

Hendrella sinensis is a species of tephritid or fruit flies in the genus Hendrella of the family Tephritidae.

== Distribution ==
It is found in China.
