= Aciurina notata =

Scientific classification
- Kingdom: Animalia
- Phylum: Arthropoda
- Class: Insecta
- Order: Diptera
- Family: Tephritidae
- Subfamily: Tephritinae
- Tribe: Dithrycini
- Genus: Aciurina
- Species: A. notata

Binomial name
- Aciurina notata (Coquillett, 1899)

Synonyms
- Trypeta notata Coquillett, 1899

Species of fly

Aciurina notata is a species of tephritid or fruit flies in the genus Aciurina of the family Tephritidae.

== Distribution ==
United States.
