= Oedaspis villeneuvei =

Scientific classification
- Kingdom: Animalia
- Phylum: Arthropoda
- Clade: Pancrustacea
- Class: Insecta
- Order: Diptera
- Family: Tephritidae
- Subfamily: Tephritinae
- Tribe: Dithrycini
- Subtribe: Platensinina
- Genus: Oedaspis
- Species: O. villeneuvei

Binomial name
- Oedaspis villeneuvei Bezzi, 1913

Species of fly

Oedaspis villeneuvei is a species of tephritid or fruit flies in the genus Oedaspis of the family Tephritidae.

== Distribution ==
Algeria, Libya, Egypt, Israel.
