= Aciurina aplopappi =

Scientific classification
- Kingdom: Animalia
- Phylum: Arthropoda
- Class: Insecta
- Order: Diptera
- Family: Tephritidae
- Subfamily: Tephritinae
- Tribe: Dithrycini
- Genus: Aciurina
- Species: A. aplopappi

Binomial name
- Aciurina aplopappi (Coquillett, 1894)

Synonyms
- Trypeta aplopappi Coquillett, 1894

Species of fly

Aciurina aplopappi is a species of tephritid or fruit flies in the genus Aciurina of the family Tephritidae.

== Distribution ==
United States.
