= Ptiloedaspis tavaresiana =

Scientific classification
- Kingdom: Animalia
- Phylum: Arthropoda
- Class: Insecta
- Order: Diptera
- Family: Tephritidae
- Subfamily: Tephritinae
- Tribe: Dithrycini
- Genus: Ptiloedaspis
- Species: P. tavaresiana

Binomial name
- Ptiloedaspis tavaresiana Bezzi, 1920

Species of fly

Ptiloedaspis tavaresiana is a species of tephritid or fruit flies in the genus Ptiloedaspis of the family Tephritidae.

== Distribution ==
Spain.
