= Hendrella heringi =

Scientific classification
- Kingdom: Animalia
- Phylum: Arthropoda
- Class: Insecta
- Order: Diptera
- Family: Tephritidae
- Subfamily: Tephritinae
- Tribe: Dithrycini
- Genus: Hendrella
- Species: H. heringi

Binomial name
- Hendrella heringi (Hardy, 1970)

Synonyms
- Tephrella heringi Hardy, 1970

Species of fly

Hendrella heringi is a species of tephritid or fruit flies in the genus Hendrella of the family Tephritidae.

== Distribution ==
New Ireland.
