= Placaciura alacris =

Scientific classification
- Kingdom: Animalia
- Phylum: Arthropoda
- Class: Insecta
- Order: Diptera
- Family: Tephritidae
- Subfamily: Tephritinae
- Tribe: Dithrycini
- Genus: Placaciura
- Species: P. alacris

Binomial name
- Placaciura alacris (Loew, 1869)

Synonyms
- Aciura alacris Loew, 1869)

Species of fly

Placaciura alacris is a species of tephritid or fruit flies in the genus Placaciura of the family Tephritidae.

== Distribution ==
Russia.
