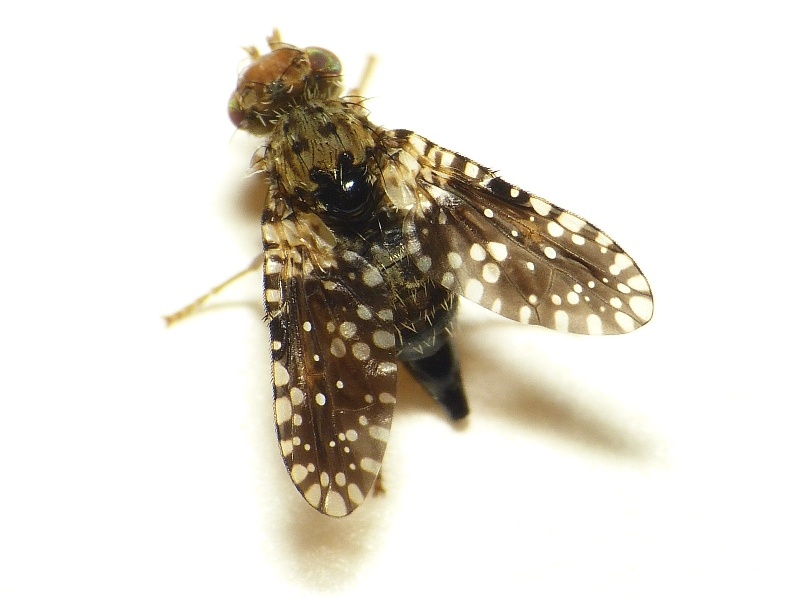

Scientific classification
- Kingdom: Animalia
- Phylum: Arthropoda
- Class: Insecta
- Order: Diptera
- Family: Tephritidae
- Subfamily: Tephritinae
- Tribe: Dithrycini
- Genus: Dithryca
- Species: D. guttularis

Binomial name
- Dithryca guttularis (Meigen, 1838)

Synonyms
- Carphotricha guttulosa Loew, 1869; Tephritis capitata Fallén, 1826; Tripeta gutturalis Lioy, 1864; Trypeta guttularis Meigen, 1826

= Dithryca guttularis =

Species of fly

Dithryca guttularis is a species of tephritid or fruit flies in the genus Dithryca of the family Tephritidae.

== Distribution ==
Europe & West Siberia South to France, Italy, Ukraine & Kazakhstan.
