= Oedoncus =

Scientific classification
- Kingdom: Animalia
- Phylum: Arthropoda
- Class: Insecta
- Order: Diptera
- Family: Tephritidae
- Subfamily: Tephritinae
- Tribe: Dithrycini
- Genus: Oedoncus; Speiser, 1924

Type species
- Rhynchoedaspis munroana Bezzi, 1924

Synonyms
- Rhynchoedaspis Bezzi, 1924

Genus of flies

Oedoncus is a genus of tephritid or fruit flies in the family Tephritidae.

== Species ==
- Oedoncus taenipalpis Speiser, 1924
