= Xenodorella =

Scientific classification
- Kingdom: Animalia
- Phylum: Arthropoda
- Class: Insecta
- Order: Diptera
- Family: Tephritidae
- Subfamily: Tephritinae
- Tribe: Dithrycini
- Genus: Xenodorella; Munro, 1967

Type species
- Xenodorella mira Munro, 1967

Genus of flies

Xenodorella is a genus of tephritid or fruit flies in the family Tephritidae.

== Species ==
- Xenodorella mira Munro, 1967
