= Placaciura =

Scientific classification
- Kingdom: Animalia
- Phylum: Arthropoda
- Class: Insecta
- Order: Diptera
- Family: Tephritidae
- Subfamily: Tephritinae
- Tribe: Dithrycini
- Genus: Placaciura; Hendel, 1927

Type species
- Aciura alacris Loew, 1869

Genus of flies

Placaciura is a genus of tephritid or fruit flies in the family Tephritidae.

== Species ==
- Placaciura alacris (Loew, 1869)
