= Aciurina =

Scientific classification
- Kingdom: Animalia
- Phylum: Arthropoda
- Class: Insecta
- Order: Diptera
- Family: Tephritidae
- Subfamily: Tephritinae
- Tribe: Dithrycini
- Genus: Aciurina; Curran, 1932

Type species
- Aciurina trixa Curran, 1932

Synonyms
- Tephrella Bates, 1935

Genus of flies

Aciurina is a genus of tephritid or fruit flies in the family Tephritidae.

== Species ==
- Aciurina aplopappi (Coquillett, 1894)
- Aciurina bigeloviae (Cockerell, 1890)
- Aciurina ferruginea (Doane, 1899)
- Aciurina idahoensis Steyskal, 1984
- Aciurina lutea (Coquillett, 1899)
- Aciurina maculata (Cole, 1919)
- Aciurina mexicana (Aczél, 1953)
- Aciurina michaeli Goeden, 1996
- Aciurina mixteca Hernández-Ortiz, 1994
- Aciurina notata (Coquillett, 1899)
- Aciurina opaca (Coquillett, 1899)
- Aciurina semilucida (Bates, 1935)
- Aciurina thoracica Curran, 1932
- Aciurina trilitura Blanc & Foote, 1961
- Aciurina trixa Curran, 1932
