= Ptiloedaspis =

Scientific classification
- Kingdom: Animalia
- Phylum: Arthropoda
- Clade: Pancrustacea
- Class: Insecta
- Order: Diptera
- Family: Tephritidae
- Subfamily: Tephritinae
- Tribe: Dithrycini
- Genus: Ptiloedaspis; Bezzi, 1920

Type species
- Ptiloedaspis tavaresiana Bezzi, 1920

Genus of flies

Ptiloedaspis is a genus of tephritid or fruit flies in the family Tephritidae.

== Species ==
- Ptiloedaspis tavaresiana Bezzi, 1920
