= Peronyma =

Scientific classification
- Kingdom: Animalia
- Phylum: Arthropoda
- Class: Insecta
- Order: Diptera
- Family: Tephritidae
- Subfamily: Tephritinae
- Tribe: Dithrycini
- Genus: Peronyma; Loew, 1873

Type species
- Trypeta sarcinata Loew, 1873

Synonyms
- Tomoplagina Curran, 1932

Genus of flies

Peronyma is a genus of tephritid or fruit flies in the family Tephritidae.

== Species ==
- Peronyma quadrifasciata (Macquart, 1843)
