= Valentibulla =

Scientific classification
- Kingdom: Animalia
- Phylum: Arthropoda
- Class: Insecta
- Order: Diptera
- Family: Tephritidae
- Subfamily: Tephritinae
- Tribe: Dithrycini
- Genus: Valentibulla; Foote & Blanc, 1959

Genus of flies

Valentibulla is a genus of tephritid or fruit flies in the family Tephritidae.

== Species ==
- Valentibulla californica (Coquillett, 1894)
- Valentibulla dodsoni Foote, 1987
- Valentibulla munda (Coquillett, 1899)
- Valentibulla mundulata Foote, 1979
- Valentibulla steyskali Foote, 1977
- Valentibulla thurmanae Foote, 1959
