= Valentibulla californica =

Scientific classification
- Kingdom: Animalia
- Phylum: Arthropoda
- Class: Insecta
- Order: Diptera
- Family: Tephritidae
- Subfamily: Tephritinae
- Tribe: Dithrycini
- Genus: Valentibulla
- Species: V. californica

Binomial name
- Valentibulla californica (Coquillett, 1894)

Synonyms
- Trypeta californica Coquillett, 1894; Euaresta mundula Coquillett, 1899

Species of fly

Valentibulla californica is a species of tephritid or fruit flies in the genus Valentibulla of the family Tephritidae.

== Distribution ==
United States.
