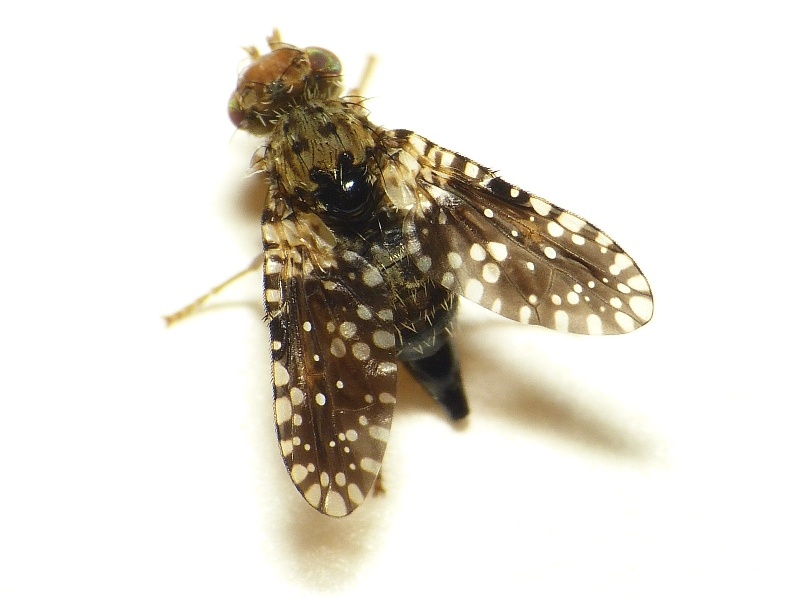
- Dithryca guttularis

Scientific classification
- Kingdom: Animalia
- Phylum: Arthropoda
- Class: Insecta
- Order: Diptera
- Family: Tephritidae
- Subfamily: Tephritinae
- Tribe: Dithrycini
- Genus: Dithryca; Rondani, 1856

Type species
- Trypeta guttularis Meigen, 1838

Synonyms
- Ditricha Rondani, 1871; Ditryca Becker, 1905; Dytricha Rondani, 1870

= Dithryca =

Genus of flies

Dithryca is a genus of the family Tephritidae, better known as fruit flies.

== Species ==
- Dithryca guttularis (Meigen, 1826)
- Dithryca guttulosa (Loew, 1869)
