= Liepana =

Scientific classification
- Kingdom: Animalia
- Phylum: Arthropoda
- Clade: Pancrustacea
- Class: Insecta
- Order: Diptera
- Family: Tephritidae
- Subfamily: Tephritinae
- Tribe: Dithrycini
- Genus: Liepana; Hardy & Drew, 1996

Type species
- Liepana latifrons Hardy & Drew, 1996

Genus of flies

Liepana is a genus of tephritid or fruit flies in the family Tephritidae.

== Species ==
- Liepana apiciclara (Hardy & Drew, 1996)
- Liepana latifrons Hardy & Drew, 1996
- Liepana lugubris (Macquart, 1847)
- Liepana helichrysii Hardy & Drew, 1996
