= Hendrella =

Scientific classification
- Kingdom: Animalia
- Phylum: Arthropoda
- Class: Insecta
- Order: Diptera
- Family: Tephritidae
- Subfamily: Tephritinae
- Tribe: Dithrycini
- Genus: Hendrella; Munro, 1938

Type species
- Trypeta caloptera Loew, 1850

Genus of flies

Hendrella is a genus of tephritid or fruit flies in the family Tephritidae.

== Species ==
- Hendrella adila (Richter, 1975)
- Hendrella basalis (Hendel, 1927)
- Hendrella caloptera (Loew, 1850)
- Hendrella heringi (Hardy, 1970)
- Hendrella ibis (Hendel, 1927)
- Hendrella kermanensis Mohamadzade Namin, Madjdzadeh & Moeinadini, 2017
- Hendrella quinquincisa Korneyev, 1989
- Hendrella sinensis Wang, 1996
- Hendrella sordida Korneyev, 1989
- Hendrella trimaculata (Hardy, 1988)
- Hendrella variegata Radhakrishnan, 1984
- Hendrella winnertzii (Frauenfeld, 1864)
