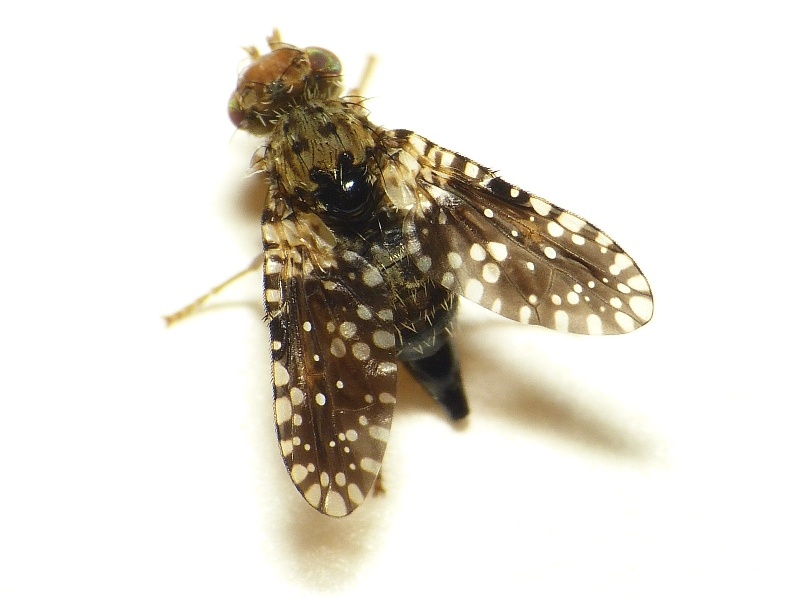
- Dithryca guttularis

Scientific classification
- Kingdom: Animalia
- Phylum: Arthropoda
- Class: Insecta
- Order: Diptera
- Family: Tephritidae
- Subfamily: Tephritinae
- Tribe: Dithrycini

= Dithrycini =

Tribe of flies

Dithrycini is a tribe of tephritid or fruit flies in the family Tephritidae.

== Genera ==
- Aciurina Curran, 1932
- Dithryca Rondani, 1856
- Eurosta Loew, 1873
- Hendrella Munro, 1938
- Liepana Hardy & Drew, 1996
- Oedaspis Loew, 1862
- Oedoncus Speiser, 1924
- Peronyma Loew, 1873
- Placaciura Hendel, 1927
- Ptiloedaspis Bezzi, 1920
- Valentibulla Foote & Blanc, 1959
- Xenodorella Munro, 1967
