= Genea trifaria =

Scientific classification
- Kingdom: Animalia
- Phylum: Arthropoda
- Clade: Pancrustacea
- Class: Insecta
- Order: Diptera
- Family: Tachinidae
- Subfamily: Tachininae
- Tribe: Leskiini
- Genus: Genea
- Species: G. trifaria

Binomial name
- Genea trifaria (Wiedemann, 1824)

Synonyms
- Stomoxys trifaria Wiedemann, 1824; Geneoglossa glossata Townsend, 1935; Genea maculiventris Rondani, 1850

Species of fly

Genea trifaria is a species of bristle fly in the family Tachinidae.

== Distribution ==
Brazil, Venezuela
