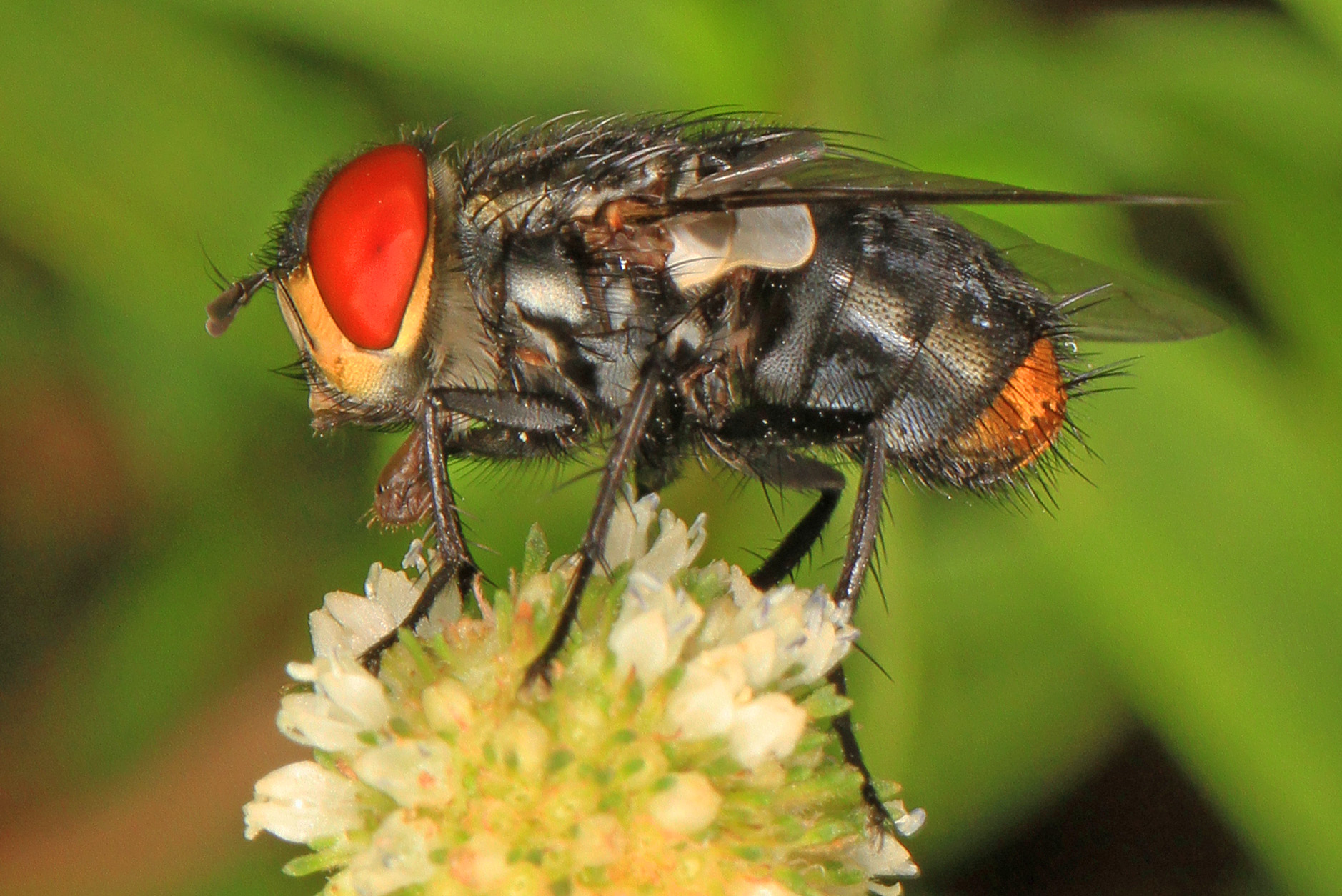

Scientific classification
- Kingdom: Animalia
- Phylum: Arthropoda
- Class: Insecta
- Order: Diptera
- Family: Tachinidae
- Subfamily: Exoristinae
- Tribe: Goniini
- Genus: Atacta
- Species: A. brasiliensis

Binomial name
- Atacta brasiliensis Schiner, 1868

Synonyms
- Atacta apicalis Coquillett, 1897; Brachycoma laticeps Wulp, 1890

= Atacta brasiliensis =

Species of fly

Atacta brasiliensis is a species of bristle fly in the family Tachinidae.

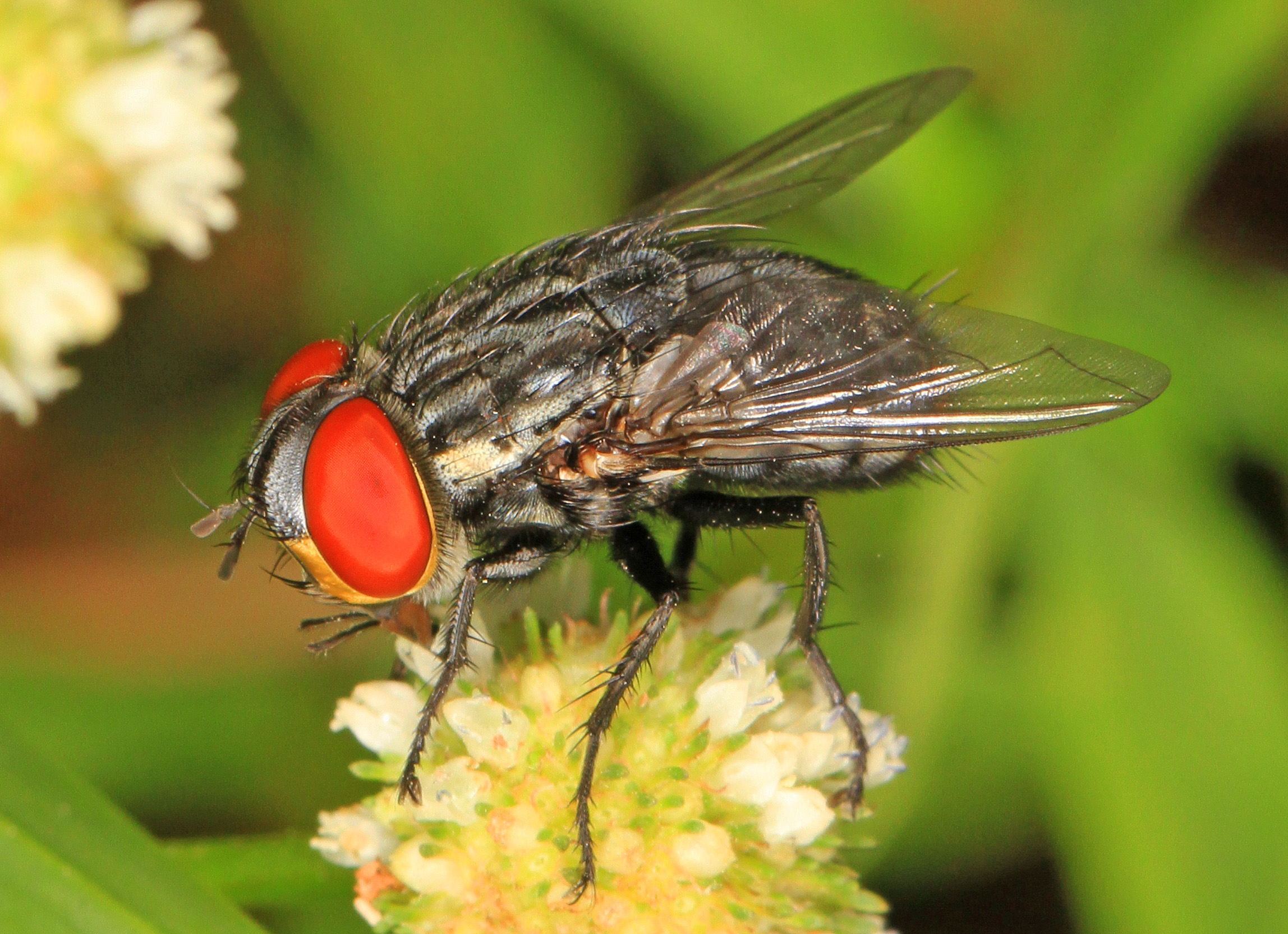

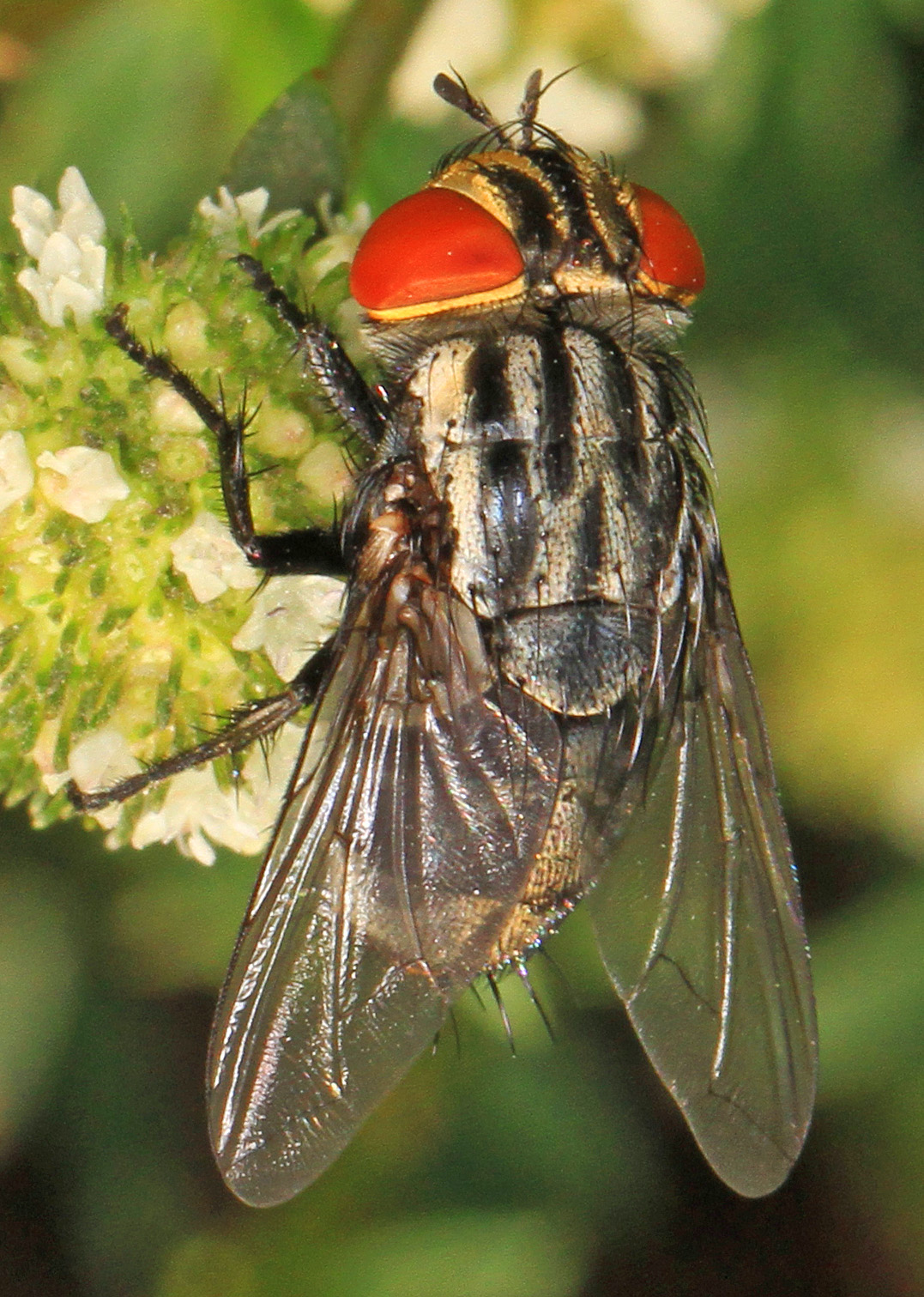

== Distribution ==
United States, Trinidad and Tobago, Costa Rica, Guatemala, Honduras, Mexico, Nicaragua, Panama, Brazil, Peru, Venezuela.
