= Genea brevirostris =

Scientific classification
- Kingdom: Animalia
- Phylum: Arthropoda
- Class: Insecta
- Order: Diptera
- Family: Tachinidae
- Subfamily: Tachininae
- Tribe: Leskiini
- Genus: Genea
- Species: G. brevirostris

Binomial name
- Genea brevirostris James, 1947

Synonyms
- Leskiella brevirostris James, 1947

Species of fly

Genea brevirostris is a species of bristle fly in the family Tachinidae.

== Distribution ==
United States.
