= Genea aurea =

Scientific classification
- Kingdom: Animalia
- Phylum: Arthropoda
- Class: Insecta
- Order: Diptera
- Family: Tachinidae
- Subfamily: Tachininae
- Tribe: Leskiini
- Genus: Genea
- Species: G. aurea

Binomial name
- Genea aurea James, 1947

Species of fly

Genea aurea is a species of bristle fly in the family Tachinidae.

== Distribution ==
United States.
