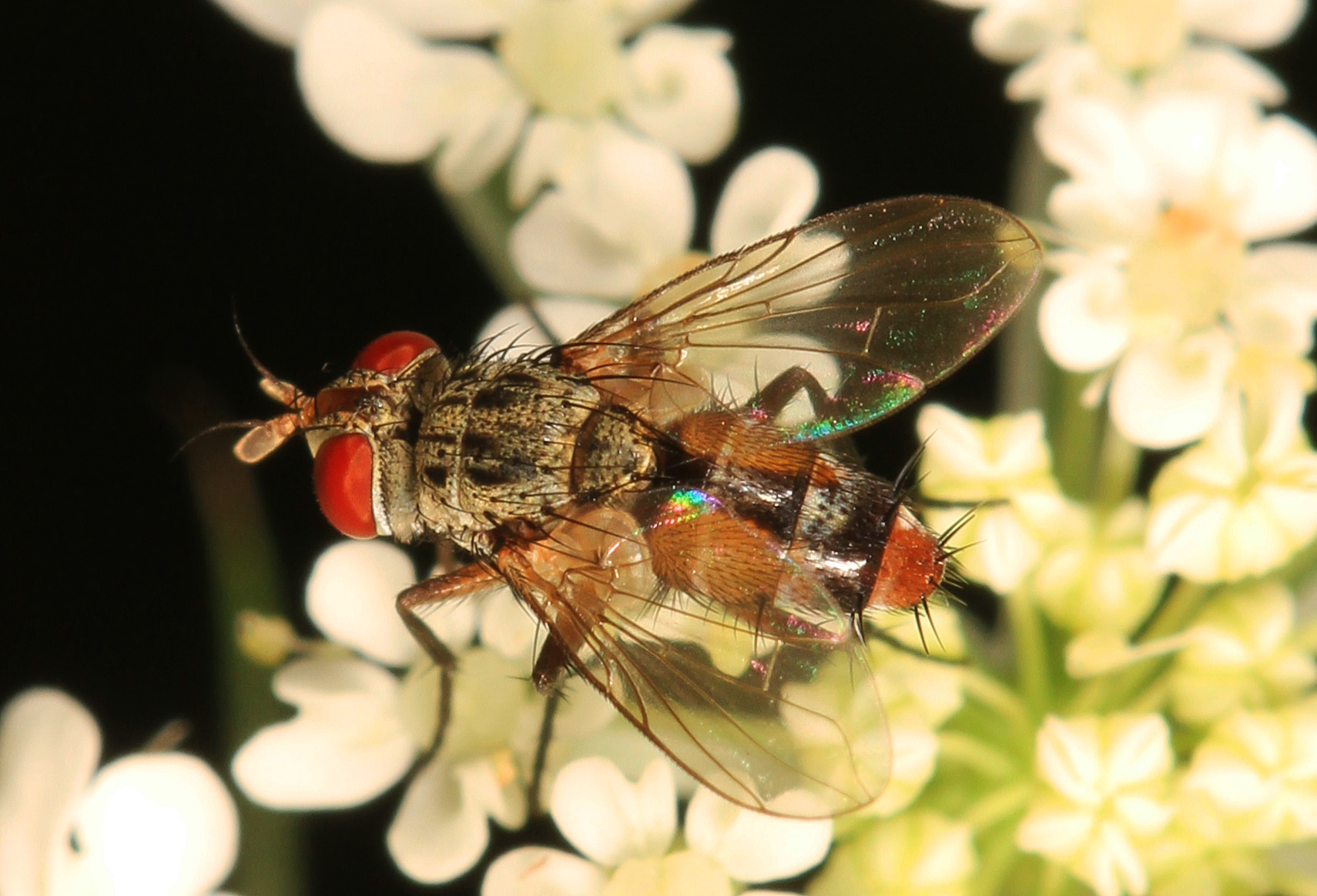
- Genea pavonacea

Scientific classification
- Kingdom: Animalia
- Phylum: Arthropoda
- Clade: Pancrustacea
- Class: Insecta
- Order: Diptera
- Family: Tachinidae
- Subfamily: Tachininae
- Tribe: Leskiini
- Genus: Genea; Rondani, 1850

Synonyms
- Dejeaniopalpus Townsend, 1916; Geneoglossa Townsend, 1935; Geneopsis Townsend, 1927; Jaynesleskia Townsend, 1934; Leskiella James, 1947; Leskiomima Brauer & von Berganstamm, 1891; Silphoclytia Neave, 1940; Siphoclytia Townsend, 1892

= Genea (fly) =

Genus of flies

Genea is a genus of flies in the family Tachinidae.

== Species ==
- Genea aurea James, 1947
- Genea australis (Townsend, 1929)
- Genea brasiliensis (Townsend, 1929)
- Genea brevirostris (James, 1947)
- Genea cinerea (James, 1947)
- Genea gracilis James, 1947
- Genea jayensi (Aldrich, 1924)
- Genea longipalpis (Wulp, 1890)
- Genea major (Townsend, 1927)
- Genea pavonacea (Reinhard, 1939)
- Genea tenera (Wiedemann, 1830)
- Genea tenuirostris (James, 1947)
- Genea texensis (Townsend, 1916)
- Genea trifaria (Wiedemann, 1824)
