= Genea texensis =

Scientific classification
- Kingdom: Animalia
- Phylum: Arthropoda
- Class: Insecta
- Order: Diptera
- Family: Tachinidae
- Subfamily: Tachininae
- Tribe: Leskiini
- Genus: Genea
- Species: G. texensis

Binomial name
- Genea texensis (Townsend, 1916)

Synonyms
- Dejeaniopalpus texensis Townsend, 1916

Species of fly

Genea texensis is a species of bristle fly in the family Tachinidae.

== Distribution ==
United States.
