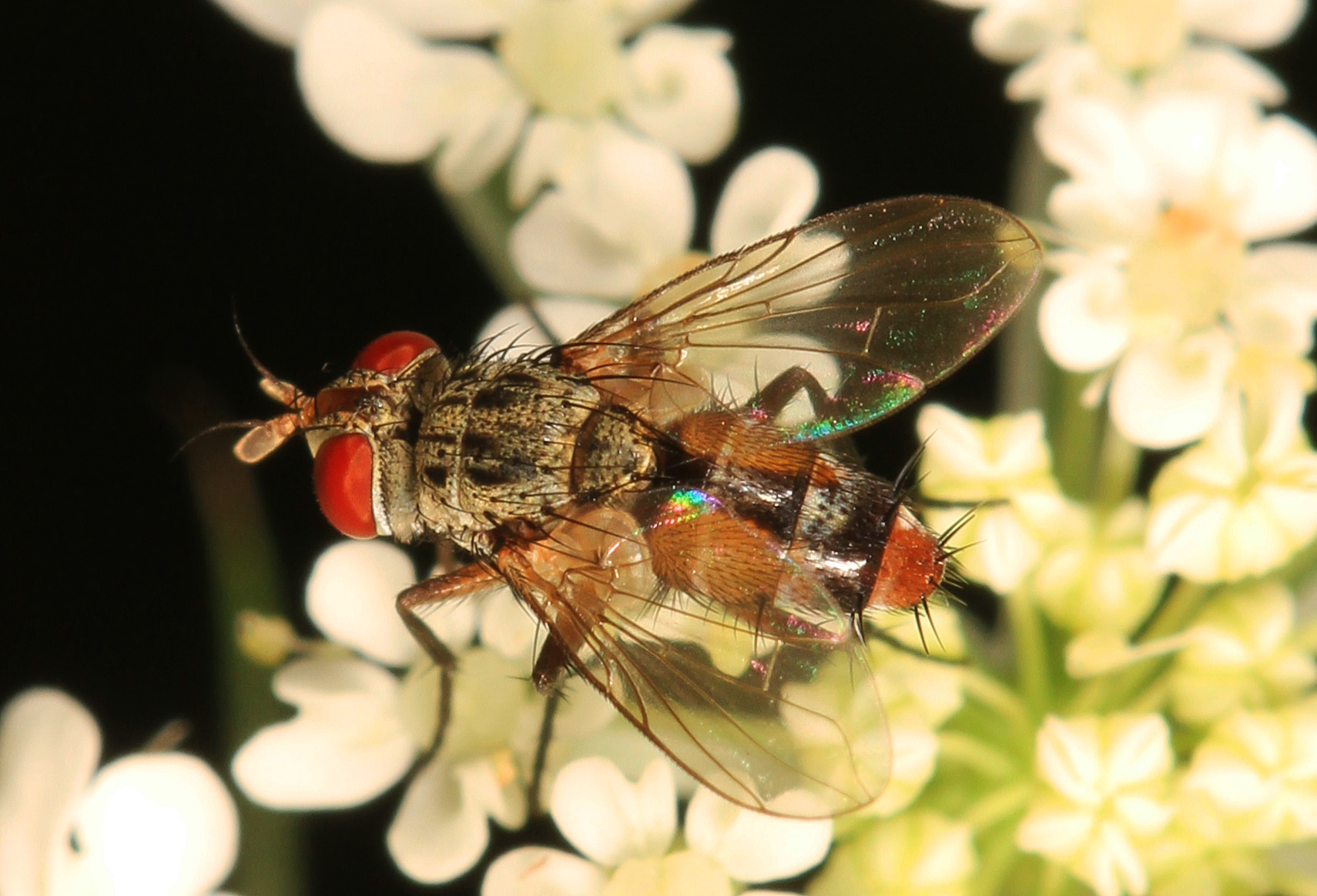

Scientific classification
- Kingdom: Animalia
- Phylum: Arthropoda
- Clade: Pancrustacea
- Class: Insecta
- Order: Diptera
- Family: Tachinidae
- Subfamily: Tachininae
- Tribe: Leskiini
- Genus: Genea
- Species: G. pavonacea

Binomial name
- Genea pavonacea (Reinhard, 1939)

Synonyms
- Siphoclytia pavonacea Reinhard, 1939

= Genea pavonacea =

Species of fly

Genea pavonacea is a species of bristle fly in the family Tachinidae.

== Distribution ==
This type of Bristle fly in found in the United States.
