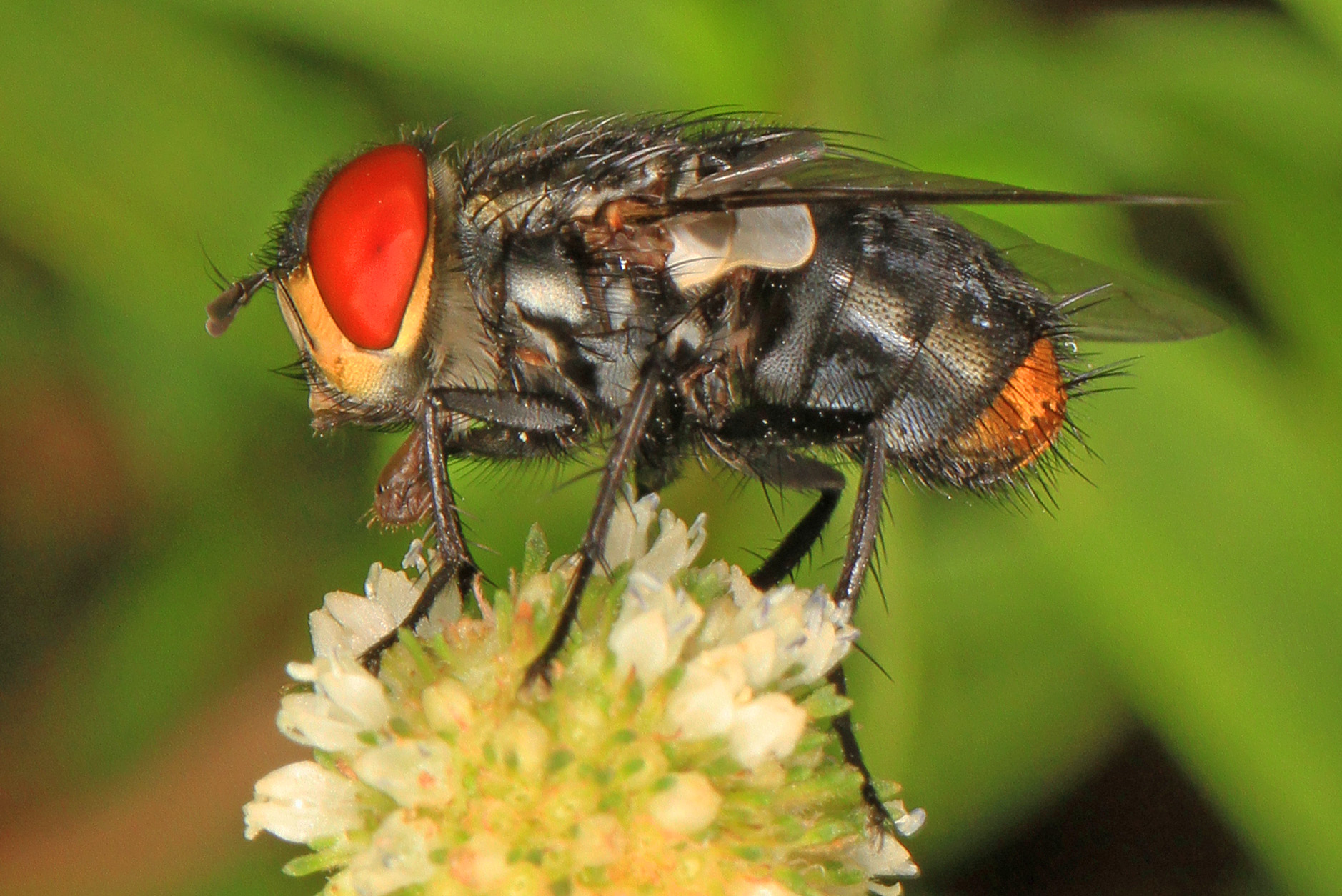
- Atacta brasiliensis

Scientific classification
- Kingdom: Animalia
- Phylum: Arthropoda
- Clade: Pancrustacea
- Class: Insecta
- Order: Diptera
- Family: Tachinidae
- Subfamily: Exoristinae
- Tribe: Goniini
- Genus: Atacta; Schiner, 1868

Type species
- Atacta brasiliensis Schiner, 1868

Synonyms
- Atactomima Townsend, 1916; Atactomina Neave, 1939

= Atacta =

Genus of flies

Atacta is a genus of flies in the family Tachinidae.

== Species ==
- Atacta argentifrons Aldrich, 1925
- Atacta brasiliensis Schiner, 1868
- Atacta crassiceps Aldrich, 1925
- Atacta crescentis (Townsend, 1916)
