= List of Merosargus species =

This is a list of 145 species in Merosargus, a genus of soldier flies in the family Stratiomyidae.

== Merosargus species ==
- Merosargus abana Curran, 1932
- Merosargus acutus James, 1971
- Merosargus aeneus (Lindner, 1949)
- Merosargus akrei James & McFadden, 1971
- Merosargus albidus McFadden, 1971
- Merosargus albifacies James, 1941
- Merosargus albopictus James, 1971
- Merosargus alticola McFadden, 1971
- Merosargus altifrons James, 1971
- Merosargus amethystinus (Lindner, 1969)
- Merosargus ampulla James, 1971
- Merosargus andinus James, 1971
- Merosargus angulatus McFadden, 1971
- Merosargus angustus James, 1971
- Merosargus antennatus Schiner, 1868
- Merosargus anticus Curran, 1932
- Merosargus apicalis Lindner, 1935
- Merosargus arcuatus James, 1971
- Merosargus atriannulatus McFadden, 1971
- Merosargus aureonitens James, 1971
- Merosargus aurivena James, 1971
- Merosargus azureus (Enderlein, 1914)
- Merosargus banksi James, 1936
- Merosargus barbatus James, 1971
- Merosargus basalis James, 1971
- Merosargus beameri James, 1941
- Merosargus bequaerti Curran, 1928
- Merosargus bitaeniatus Lindner, 1949
- Merosargus bituberculatus Schiner, 1868
- Merosargus bivittatus James, 1971
- Merosargus brachiatus James, 1971
- Merosargus brunneus Lindner, 1933
- Merosargus brunnipes McFadden, 1971
- Merosargus bulbifrons Williston, 1900
- Merosargus c-nigrum (Lindner, 1951)
- Merosargus caeruleifrons (Johnson, 1900)
- Merosargus calceolatus Bigot, 1879
- Merosargus chalconota (Brauer, 1882)
- Merosargus cingulatus Schiner, 1868
- Merosargus citrinus James, 1971
- Merosargus complicatus James, 1971
- Merosargus concinnatus Williston, 1900
- Merosargus conopsoides James, 1971
- Merosargus contortus James, 1971
- Merosargus coriaceus Giglio-Tos, 1891
- Merosargus coxalis Lindner, 1949
- Merosargus cyaneoscutellatus (Enderlein, 1914)
- Merosargus cyrtometopius James, 1971
- Merosargus degenerata (Lindner, 1949)
- Merosargus dissimilis Giglio-Tos, 1891
- Merosargus divisus James, 1971
- Merosargus dorsalis Lindner, 1969
- Merosargus elatus Curran, 1932
- Merosargus elongatus James, 1971
- Merosargus ethelia Curran, 1932
- Merosargus eunomus James, 1967
- Merosargus festivus Williston, 1888
- Merosargus flaviceps McFadden, 1971
- Merosargus flavissimus James, 1971
- Merosargus flavitarsis (Lindner, 1969)
- Merosargus flaviventris (Lindner, 1935)
- Merosargus fraternus Bigot, 1879
- Merosargus frontatus Schiner, 1868
- Merosargus frosti James, 1941
- Merosargus fumipennis James, 1971
- Merosargus geminatus James, 1971
- Merosargus golbachi James, 1971
- Merosargus gorgona (Lindner, 1949)
- Merosargus gowdeyi Curran, 1928
- Merosargus gracilior James, 1971
- Merosargus gracilis Williston, 1888
- Merosargus granulosus James, 1971
- Merosargus hansoni James, 1971
- Merosargus hoffmanni Lindner, 1935
- Merosargus hyalopterus Giglio-Tos, 1891
- Merosargus insularis Curran, 1934
- Merosargus irwini James & McFadden, 1971
- Merosargus lacrimosus James, 1971
- Merosargus lampronotus James, 1941
- Merosargus laniger James, 1971
- Merosargus lateromaculatus James, 1971
- Merosargus linearis James, 1971
- Merosargus longipes McFadden, 1971
- Merosargus longiventris (Enderlein, 1914)
- Merosargus luridus Loew, 1855
- Merosargus lutzi Curran, 1932
- Merosargus lyricus James & McFadden, 1971
- Merosargus megalopyge James, 1971
- Merosargus melanothorax McFadden, 1971
- Merosargus mirabilis James, 1971
- Merosargus nebulifer James, 1971
- Merosargus nigribasis James, 1971
- Merosargus notatus Lindner, 1949
- Merosargus obscurus (Wiedemann, 1830)
- Merosargus obtusipennis (Lindner, 1949)
- Merosargus opaliger Lindner, 1931
- Merosargus orizabae Giglio-Tos, 1891
- Merosargus pallidus McFadden, 1971
- Merosargus pallifrons Curran, 1932
- Merosargus panamensis McFadden, 1971
- Merosargus par Curran, 1932
- Merosargus penai James, 1971
- Merosargus peruvianus James, 1971
- Merosargus picta (Brauer, 1882)
- Merosargus pictipes James, 1971
- Merosargus pictithorax Curran, 1933
- Merosargus productus James, 1971
- Merosargus pseudolyricus James, 1971
- Merosargus pulcher James, 1971
- Merosargus quadratus James, 1971
- Merosargus quadrifasciatus Lindner, 1941
- Merosargus robustus McFadden, 1971
- Merosargus rossi James, 1971
- Merosargus rotundatus Curran, 1932
- Merosargus schildi James, 1971
- Merosargus scrobiculus McFadden, 1971
- Merosargus sexmaculatus McFadden, 1971
- Merosargus sexnotatus James, 1941
- Merosargus smaragdiferus (Bigot, 1879)
- Merosargus spatulatus (Williston, 1900)
- Merosargus stamineus (Fabricius, 1805)
- Merosargus stigmaticus (Lindner, 1949)
- Merosargus subinterruptus (Bellardi, 1859)
- Merosargus subobscurus Lindner, 1969
- Merosargus supernitens James, 1971
- Merosargus taeniatus (Wiedemann, 1830)
- Merosargus tangens James, 1971
- Merosargus telfordi James, 1971
- Merosargus tenebricosus Lindner, 1929
- Merosargus tenuicornis James, 1971
- Merosargus terminalis James, 1971
- Merosargus transversus McFadden, 1971
- Merosargus triangulatus McFadden, 1971
- Merosargus tripartitus James, 1971
- Merosargus tristis Loew, 1855
- Merosargus tritaeniatus Lindner, 1929
- Merosargus varicornis James, 1971
- Merosargus varicrus James, 1971
- Merosargus ventralis McFadden, 1971
- Merosargus venustulus (Lindner, 1936)
- Merosargus vertebratus James, 1971
- Merosargus viridis McFadden, 1971
- Merosargus zeteki James, 1971
