= List of Sargus species =

This is a list of species in Sargus, a genus of soldier flies in the family Stratiomyidae.

== Sargus species ==
- Sargus albibarbus Loew, 1855
- Sargus albopilosus Meijere, 1906
- Sargus alchidas Walker, 1849
- Sargus analis (Williston, 1888)
- Sargus atrobasis (James, 1941)
- Sargus aureopilosus McFadden, 1982
- Sargus aurora (Lindner, 1935)
- Sargus baculventerus Yang & Chen, 1993
- Sargus bagosas Walker, 1849
- Sargus beppui Nagatomi, 1990
- Sargus bipunctatus (Scopoli, 1763)
- Sargus brasiliensis Wiedemann, 1830
- Sargus brevis Yang, Zhang & Li, 2014
- Sargus caeruleapex McFadden, 1982
- Sargus chrysis Loew, 1855
- Sargus circumcinctus (James, 1941)
- Sargus cirrhosus McFadden, 1982
- Sargus citrinellus (Lindner, 1949)
- Sargus clavatus Walker, 1854
- Sargus claviventris Rondani, 1850
- Sargus concisus Walker, 1861
- Sargus congoense (Lindner, 1965)
- Sargus contractus Walker, 1854
- Sargus cuprarius (Linnaeus, 1758)
- Sargus cyaneus (Brunetti, 1912)
- Sargus darius Hardy, 1932
- Sargus decorus Say, 1824
- Sargus elegans Loew, 1866
- Sargus elongatulus McFadden, 1982
- Sargus evansi McFadden, 1982
- Sargus fasciatus Fabricius, 1805
- Sargus festivus Jaennicke, 1867
- Sargus flavilatus James, 1973
- Sargus flavipes (Lindner, 1966)
- Sargus flavipes Meigen, 1822
- Sargus flavopilosus (Bigot, 1879)
- Sargus gemmifer Walker, 1849
- Sargus goliath (Curran, 1927)
- Sargus grandis (Ôuchi, 1938)
- Sargus gselli Hill, 1919
- Sargus huangshanensis Yang, Yu & Yang, 2012
- Sargus illuminata (Lindner, 1949)
- Sargus inactus Walker, 1859
- Sargus inficitus Walker, 1861
- Sargus iridatus (Scopoli, 1763)
- Sargus isthmi James, 1982
- Sargus jaennickei Woodley, 2001
- Sargus jamesi (Lindner, 1966)
- Sargus jucundus Walker, 1850
- Sargus laetus Wulp, 1885
- Sargus lateralis Macquart, 1834
- Sargus lateropictus James, 1982
- Sargus latifrons Yang, Zhang & Li, 2014
- Sargus latipennis (Brunetti, 1923)
- Sargus latus Bellardi, 1859
- Sargus lii Chen, Liang & Yang, 2010
- Sargus limbatus Macquart, 1838
- Sargus linearis Walker, 1854
- Sargus lucidus (Lindner, 1949)
- Sargus luctuosus (Lindner, 1938)
- Sargus macquartii Perty, 1833
- Sargus mactans Walker, 1859
- Sargus maculatus (Lindner, 1936)
- Sargus mandarinus Schiner, 1868
- Sargus melleus Rondani, 1848
- Sargus meracus Nagatomi, 1975
- Sargus meridionalis White, 1916
- Sargus metallinus Fabricius, 1805
- Sargus molliculus (Nagatomi, 1975)
- Sargus multicolor (Lindner, 1949)
- Sargus nigricoxa Yang, Zhang & Li, 2014
- Sargus nigrifacies Yang, Zhang & Li, 2014
- Sargus nigripes (Lindner, 1955)
- Sargus niphonensis Bigot, 1879
- Sargus opulentum (Grünberg, 1915)
- Sargus opulentus Walker, 1854
- Sargus pallidiventris (Brunetti, 1926)
- Sargus parastenus James, 1982
- Sargus pavo (Lindner, 1965)
- Sargus persimilis McFadden, 1982
- Sargus petersoni McFadden, 1982
- Sargus pleuriticus Loew, 1866
- Sargus polychromus James, 1982
- Sargus pseudoptecticus James, 1982
- Sargus ptecticoides (Lindner, 1935)
- Sargus ptecticoideum (Lindner, 1966)
- Sargus pubescens Wulp, 1885
- Sargus punctatus McFadden, 1982
- Sargus purpuratus Lindner, 1972
- Sargus purpureus (Walker, 1860)
- Sargus rufibasis (Bigot, 1879)
- Sargus ruficornis Macquart, 1846
- Sargus rufifrons (Pleske, 1926)
- Sargus rufipes Wahlberg, 1854
- Sargus rufitarsis (Macquart, 1846)
- Sargus schaeuffelei Lindner, 1972
- Sargus seychellensis Kertész, 1972
- Sargus sichuanensis Yang, Zhang & Li, 2014
- Sargus speciosus Macquart, 1846
- Sargus splendidus Brunetti, 1925
- Sargus stenus James, 1982
- Sargus stuckenbergi (Lindner, 1961)
- Sargus tenuis (Lindner, 1938)
- Sargus tenuiventris (Bigot, 1879)
- Sargus thoracicus Macquart, 1834
- Sargus transversus McFadden, 1982
- Sargus tricolor Yang, Zhang & Li, 2014
- Sargus tuberculatus Loew, 1855
- Sargus vandykei James, 1941
- Sargus vetus Cockerell, 1921
- Sargus viridiceps Macquart, 1855
- Sargus viridis Say, 1823
- Sargus viridistima (Brunetti, 1926)
- Sargus yerbabuena Woodley, 2001
