= List of Ptecticus species =

This is a list of species in the genus Ptecticus.

== Ptecticus species ==
- Ptecticus aculeatus James, 1952
- Ptecticus adustus Lindner, 1949
- Ptecticus aeneithorax Meijere, 1919
- Ptecticus alticola McFadden, 1982
- Ptecticus amapanus Leal, 1977
- Ptecticus annulipes Rozkošný & Kovac, 2003
- Ptecticus anomalopyga James, 1982
- Ptecticus archboldi Lindner, 1957
- Ptecticus artocarpophilus Rozkošný & Hauser, 2009
- Ptecticus assamensis Brunetti, 1923
- Ptecticus aurifer (Walker, 1854)
- Ptecticus aurobrunneus Brunetti, 1920
- Ptecticus australis Schiner, 1868
- Ptecticus bannapensis Rozkošný & Hauser, 2009
- Ptecticus benecki Torres-Toro, Pujol-Luz & Wolff, 2022
- Ptecticus bequaerti James, 1952
- Ptecticus bicolor Yang, Zhang & Li, 2014
- Ptecticus bifidus Rozkošný & Kovac, 1998
- Ptecticus bilobatus Rozkošný & Kovac, 1998
- Ptecticus brevipennis (Rondani, 1875)
- Ptecticus brevispinus Yang, Chen & Yang, 2015
- Ptecticus breviunguis Lindner, 1966
- Ptecticus briani McFadden, 1982
- Ptecticus brunescens Ôuchi, 1938
- Ptecticus ciliatus James, 1941
- Ptecticus cingulatus Loew, 1855
- Ptecticus complens (Walker, 1858)
- Ptecticus comstocki McFadden, 1982
- Ptecticus concinnus Williston, 1900
- Ptecticus confusus McFadden, 1982
- Ptecticus connectens Brunetti, 1923
- Ptecticus conopsoides Schiner, 1868
- Ptecticus costaricensis James, 1982
- Ptecticus cyanifrons (Rondani, 1848)
- Ptecticus danielsi Rozkošný & Jong, 2003
- Ptecticus elegans Rozkošný & Hauser, 2009
- Ptecticus elongatus Yang, Zhang & Li, 2014
- Ptecticus erectus Rozkošný & Kovac, 2000
- Ptecticus evansi McFadden, 1982
- Ptecticus eximius Daniels, 1979
- Ptecticus extensipes James, 1982
- Ptecticus ferrugineus (Doleschall, 1858)
- Ptecticus ficulinus Lindner, 1940
- Ptecticus figlinus Osten Sacken, 1886
- Ptecticus flaviceps Bigot, 1879
- Ptecticus flavifemoratus Rozkošný & Kovac, 1996
- Ptecticus fukienensis Rozkošný & Hauser, 2009
- Ptecticus fumipennis Rozkošný & Kovac, 2003
- Ptecticus furcatus McFadden, 1982
- Ptecticus fuscipennis McFadden, 1982
- Ptecticus gigliotosi McFadden, 1971
- Ptecticus gilvus Daniels, 1979
- Ptecticus glaucus (Bigot, 1859)
- Ptecticus guangxiensis Yang, Chen & Yang, 2015
- Ptecticus hansoni James, 1982
- Ptecticus helvolus Daniels, 1979
- Ptecticus histrio Meijere, 1933
- Ptecticus illustris Schiner, 1868
- Ptecticus immaculatus McFadden, 1982
- Ptecticus indicus Rozkošný & Hauser, 2009
- Ptecticus infuscatus Rozkošný & Hauser, 2009
- Ptecticus inops Lindner, 1949
- Ptecticus insularis James, 1972
- Ptecticus intensivus Brunetti, 1927
- Ptecticus inversus Curran, 1934
- Ptecticus isabelensis Lindner, 1937
- Ptecticus jamesi McFadden, 1982
- Ptecticus japonicus (Thunberg, 1789)
- Ptecticus kambangensis Meijere, 1914
- Ptecticus kerteszi Meijere, 1924
- Ptecticus kovaci Hauser & Rozkošný, 2007
- Ptecticus kraussi James, 1982
- Ptecticus kubani Rozkošný & Hauser, 2009
- Ptecticus lanei James, 1941
- Ptecticus lateritius (Rondani, 1863)
- Ptecticus linearis McFadden, 1982
- Ptecticus longipennis (Wiedemann, 1824)
- Ptecticus longipes (Walker, 1861)
- Ptecticus longispinus Rozkošný & Kovac, 2003
- Ptecticus maculatus Williston, 1900
- Ptecticus malayensis Rozkošný & Kovac, 1994
- Ptecticus matsumurae Lindner, 1936
- Ptecticus melanurus (Walker, 1848)
- Ptecticus mesoxanthus Grünberg, 1915
- Ptecticus mexicanus James, 1982
- Ptecticus minimus Rozkošný & Kovac, 1997
- Ptecticus mirabilis Rozkošný & Kovac, 2003
- Ptecticus nebulifer James, 1941
- Ptecticus neoaffinis Woodley, 2001
- Ptecticus niger Lindner, 1955
- Ptecticus nigritarsis McFadden, 1971
- Ptecticus nigropygialis Lindner, 1931
- Ptecticus nitidipennis Loew, 1855
- Ptecticus okinawae James, 1950
- Ptecticus palpalis Leal, 1977
- Ptecticus pangmapensis Rozkošný & Kovac, 2003
- Ptecticus papuanus (Bigot, 1879)
- Ptecticus perochreus James, 1982
- Ptecticus pesudospatulatus Torres-Toro, Pujol-Luz & Wolff, 2022
- Ptecticus petersoni McFadden, 1982
- Ptecticus petiolatus (Macquart, 1838)
- Ptecticus philippinensis Rozkošný & Kovac, 2003
- Ptecticus polyxanthus Speiser, 1908
- Ptecticus posticus (Wiedemann, 1830)
- Ptecticus proximus Rozkošný & Kovac, 1996
- Ptecticus pseudohistrio Rozkošný & Hauser, 2001
- Ptecticus quadrifasciatus (Walker, 1860)
- Ptecticus remeans (Walker, 1859)
- Ptecticus rhodesiae James, 1952
- Ptecticus rogans (Walker, 1858)
- Ptecticus rufipes Lindner, 1939
- Ptecticus rufus (Doleschall, 1858)
- Ptecticus sackenii Williston, 1885
- Ptecticus sarawakensis Rozkošný & Hauser, 2009
- Ptecticus semimetallicus Rozkošný & Hauser, 2009
- Ptecticus septentrionalis McFadden, 1982
- Ptecticus serranus Leal, 1977
- Ptecticus shirakii Nagatomi, 1975
- Ptecticus siamensis Rozkošný & Kovac, 1998
- Ptecticus simplex James, 1982
- Ptecticus sinchangensis Ôuchi, 1938
- Ptecticus somereni James, 1952
- Ptecticus spatulatus McFadden, 1982
- Ptecticus spatuloides Daniels, 1979
- Ptecticus srilankai Rozkošný & Hauser, 2001
- Ptecticus subaurifer Rozkošný & Hauser, 2009
- Ptecticus subaustralis Rozkošný & Kovac, 1998
- Ptecticus substitutus Daniels, 1979
- Ptecticus sumatranus Enderlein, 1914
- Ptecticus temasekianus Rozkošný & Kovac, 2003
- Ptecticus tenebrifer (Walker, 1849)
- Ptecticus tenuis Schiner, 1868
- Ptecticus terminalis James, 1938
- Ptecticus testaceus (Fabricius, 1805
- Ptecticus thailandicus Rozkošný & Courtney, 2005
- Ptecticus tricolor Wulp, 1904
- Ptecticus trivittatus (Say, 1829)
- Ptecticus violaceus Enderlein, 1914
- Ptecticus vitalisi Brunetti, 1924
- Ptecticus vulpianus (Enderlein, 1914)
- Ptecticus woodleyi James, 1982
- Ptecticus wulpii Brunetti, 1907
- Ptecticus xanthipes Blanchard, 1938
