= Sargus decorus =

Scientific classification
- Kingdom: Animalia
- Phylum: Arthropoda
- Class: Insecta
- Order: Diptera
- Family: Stratiomyidae
- Subfamily: Sarginae
- Genus: Sargus
- Species: S. decorus

Binomial name
- Sargus decorus Say, 1824

Synonyms
- Sargus xanthopus Wiedemann, 1830; Sargus marginatus Wulp, 1867; Sargus picticornis Bigot, 1887; Sargus pallipes Bigot, 1887; Sargus puntifer Bigot, 1887; Sargus punctifer Kertész, 1908; Sargus bigoti Brunetti, 1923; Sargus decorus subsp. alaskensis James, 1951

Species of fly

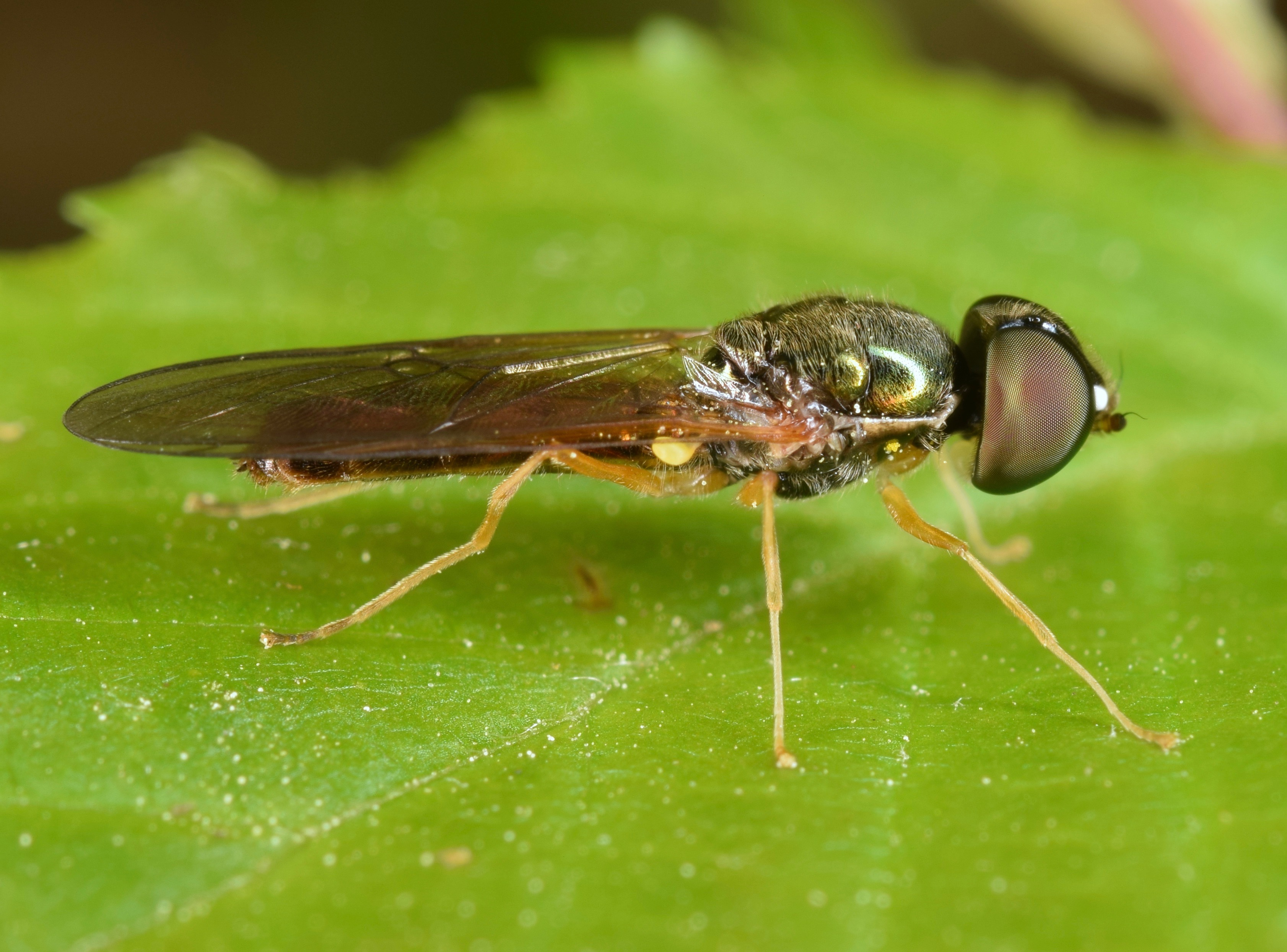
Sargus decorus on a leaf

Sargus decorus is a species of soldier fly in the family Stratiomyidae.

== Distribution ==
Widespread Nearctic.

== See also ==
- Sargus albibarbus
- Sargus bipunctatus
