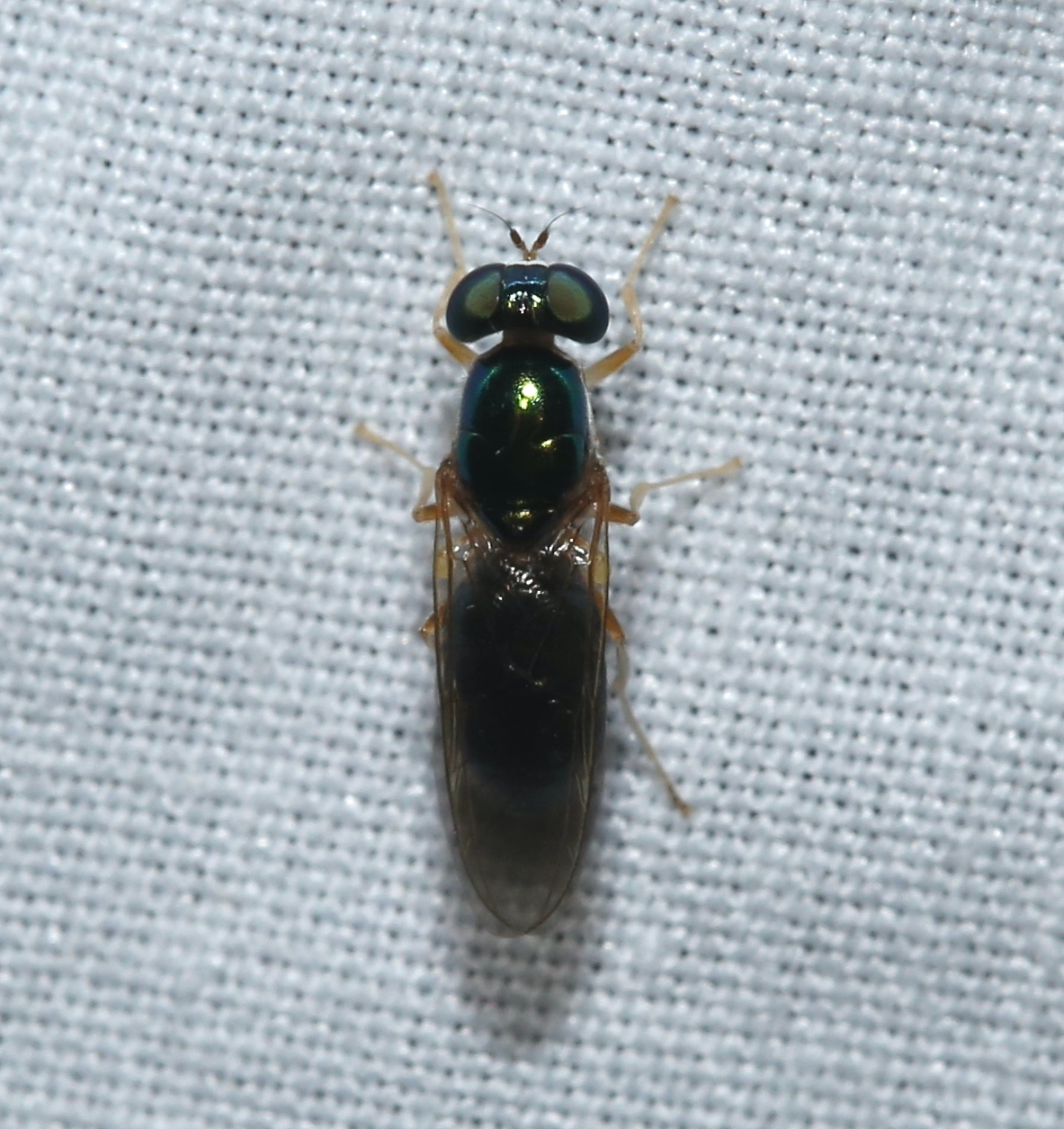

Scientific classification
- Kingdom: Animalia
- Phylum: Arthropoda
- Class: Insecta
- Order: Diptera
- Family: Stratiomyidae
- Subfamily: Sarginae
- Genus: Cephalochrysa
- Species: C. nigricornis

Binomial name
- Cephalochrysa nigricornis (Loew, 1866)

Synonyms
- Chrysochroma atriventris Graenicher, 1913; Chrysonotus nigricornis Loew, 1866

= Cephalochrysa nigricornis =

Species of fly

Cephalochrysa nigricornis is a species of soldier fly in the family Stratiomyidae.

== Distribution ==
Canada, United States.
