= Merosargus abana =

Scientific classification
- Kingdom: Animalia
- Phylum: Arthropoda
- Class: Insecta
- Order: Diptera
- Family: Stratiomyidae
- Subfamily: Sarginae
- Genus: Merosargus
- Species: M. abana

Binomial name
- Merosargus abana Curran, 1932

Species of fly

Merosargus abana is a species of soldier fly in the family Stratiomyidae.

== Distribution ==
Brazil.
