= Merosargus caeruleifrons =

Scientific classification
- Kingdom: Animalia
- Phylum: Arthropoda
- Class: Insecta
- Order: Diptera
- Family: Stratiomyidae
- Subfamily: Sarginae
- Genus: Merosargus
- Species: M. caeruleifrons

Binomial name
- Merosargus caeruleifrons (Johnson, 1900)

Synonyms
- Sargus caeruleifrons Johnson, 1900; Sargus coeruleifrons Kertész, 1908

Species of fly

Merosargus caeruleifrons is a species of soldier fly in the family Stratiomyidae.

== Distribution ==
United States.
