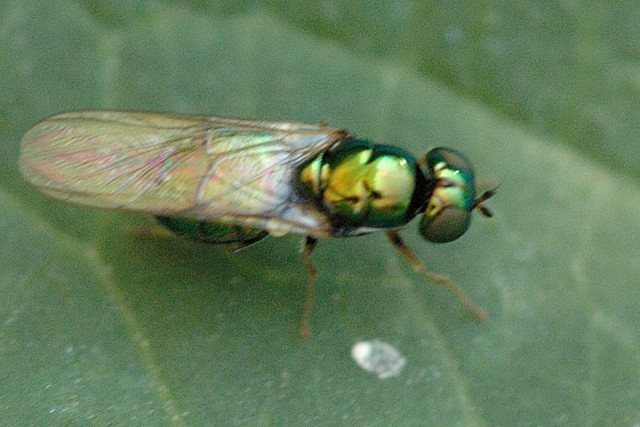

Scientific classification
- Kingdom: Animalia
- Phylum: Arthropoda
- Class: Insecta
- Order: Diptera
- Family: Stratiomyidae
- Subfamily: Sarginae
- Genus: Microchrysa
- Species: M. polita

Binomial name
- Microchrysa polita (Linnaeus, 1758)

Synonyms
- Musca polita Linnaeus, 1758; Microchrysa parvula (Harris, 1776); Microchrysa vitrea (Harris, 1776); Musca parvula Harris, 1776; Musca vitrea Harris, 1776; Microchrysa splendens (Meigen, 1804)

= Microchrysa polita =

Species of fly

Microchrysa polita, the black-horned gem, is a species of soldier fly found in Europe, Asia, and North America.

== Description ==
A small species (Body 4.5 to 5.5.mm. long) Antennae black. Legs predominantly black. Pubescence in middle part of mesonotum and on abdomen black in male.

== Biology ==
The flight period is March to September. Habitats are deciduous woodland edges, wooded areas, hedgerows, gardens, and parks. Larvae have been found in soil, decomposing grass and leaves, and compost.

== Distribution ==
Russia, Siberia, Central Asia, Mongolia, Western Europe, United States, and Canada.
