= Merosargus gracilis =

Scientific classification
- Kingdom: Animalia
- Phylum: Arthropoda
- Class: Insecta
- Order: Diptera
- Family: Stratiomyidae
- Subfamily: Sarginae
- Genus: Merosargus
- Species: M. gracilis

Binomial name
- Merosargus gracilis Williston, 1888

Species of fly

Merosargus gracilis is a species of soldier fly in the family Stratiomyidae.

== Distribution ==
Venezuela, Ecuador, Peru, Brazil.
