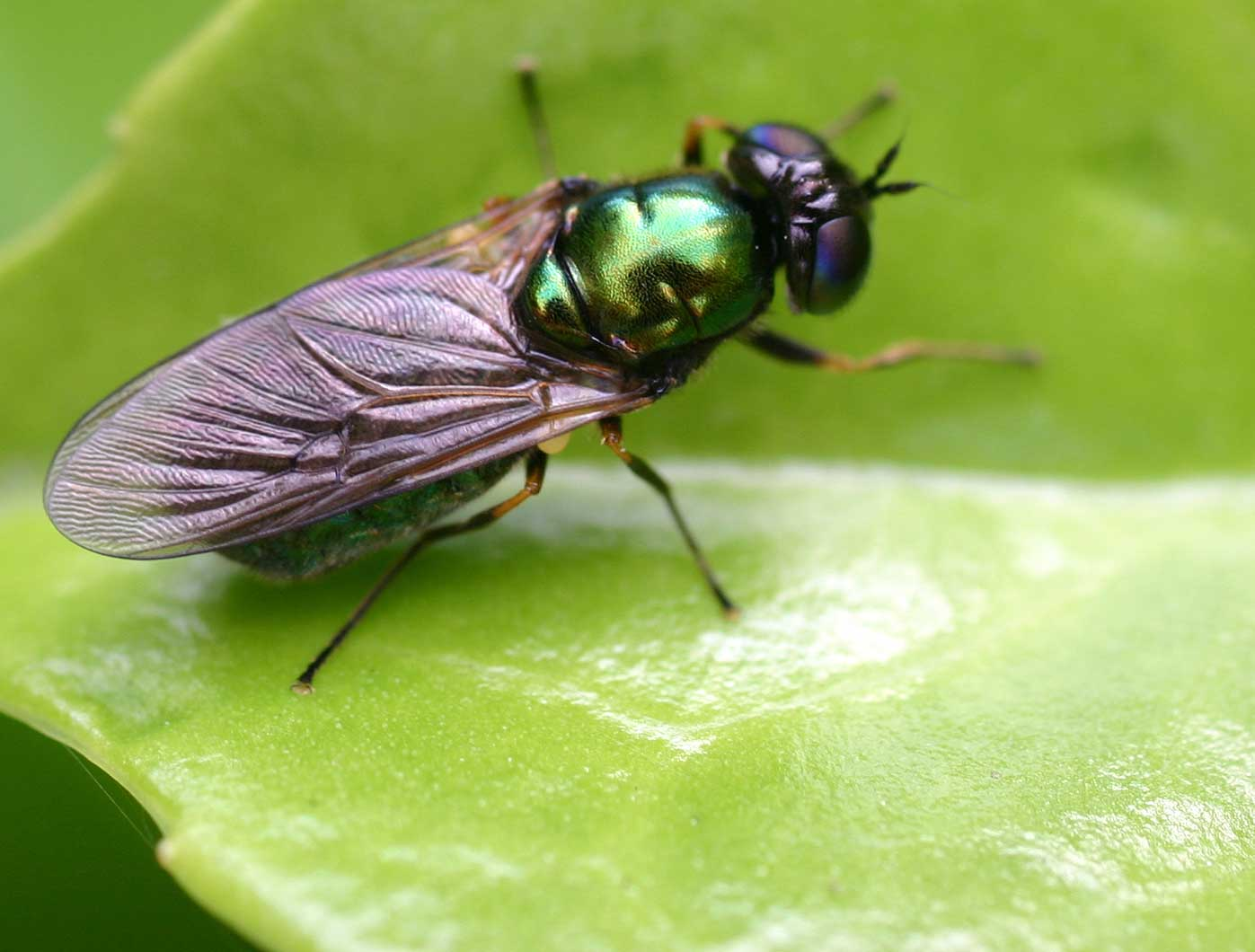

Scientific classification
- Kingdom: Animalia
- Phylum: Arthropoda
- Class: Insecta
- Order: Diptera
- Family: Stratiomyidae
- Subfamily: Sarginae
- Genus: Chloromyia
- Species: C. speciosa

Binomial name
- Chloromyia speciosa (Macquart, 1834)

Synonyms
- Chrysomyia speciosa Macquart, 1834; Sargus melampogon Zeller, 1842; Sargus melanopogon Germar, 1842; Chloromyia melampogon var. subalpina Strobl, 1910; Chloromyia melampogon var. nigripes Pleske, 1926; Sargus nigribarbis Nartshuk & Kandybina, 1984

= Chloromyia speciosa =

Species of fly

Chloromyia speciosa, is a European species of soldier fly.
