= Merosargus spatulatus =

Scientific classification
- Kingdom: Animalia
- Phylum: Arthropoda
- Class: Insecta
- Order: Diptera
- Family: Stratiomyidae
- Subfamily: Sarginae
- Genus: Merosargus
- Species: M. spatulatus

Binomial name
- Merosargus spatulatus (Williston, 1900)

Synonyms
- Macrosargus spatulatus Williston, 1900

Species of fly

Merosargus spatulatus is a species of soldier fly in the family Stratiomyidae.

== Distribution ==
Mexico.
