= Sargus harderseni =

Scientific classification
- Kingdom: Animalia
- Phylum: Arthropoda
- Class: Insecta
- Order: Diptera
- Family: Stratiomyidae
- Subfamily: Sarginae
- Genus: Sargus
- Species: S. harderseni

Binomial name
- Sargus harderseni Mason & Rozkosny, 2008

Species of fly

Sargus harderseni is a European species of soldier fly.

== Distribution ==
Sargus harderseni is found in Italy.
