= Merosargus sexnotatus =

Scientific classification
- Kingdom: Animalia
- Phylum: Arthropoda
- Clade: Pancrustacea
- Class: Insecta
- Order: Diptera
- Family: Stratiomyidae
- Subfamily: Sarginae
- Genus: Merosargus
- Species: M. sexnotatus

Binomial name
- Merosargus sexnotatus James, 1941

Species of fly

Merosargus sexnotatus is a species of soldier fly in the family Stratiomyidae.

== Distribution ==
Brazil.
