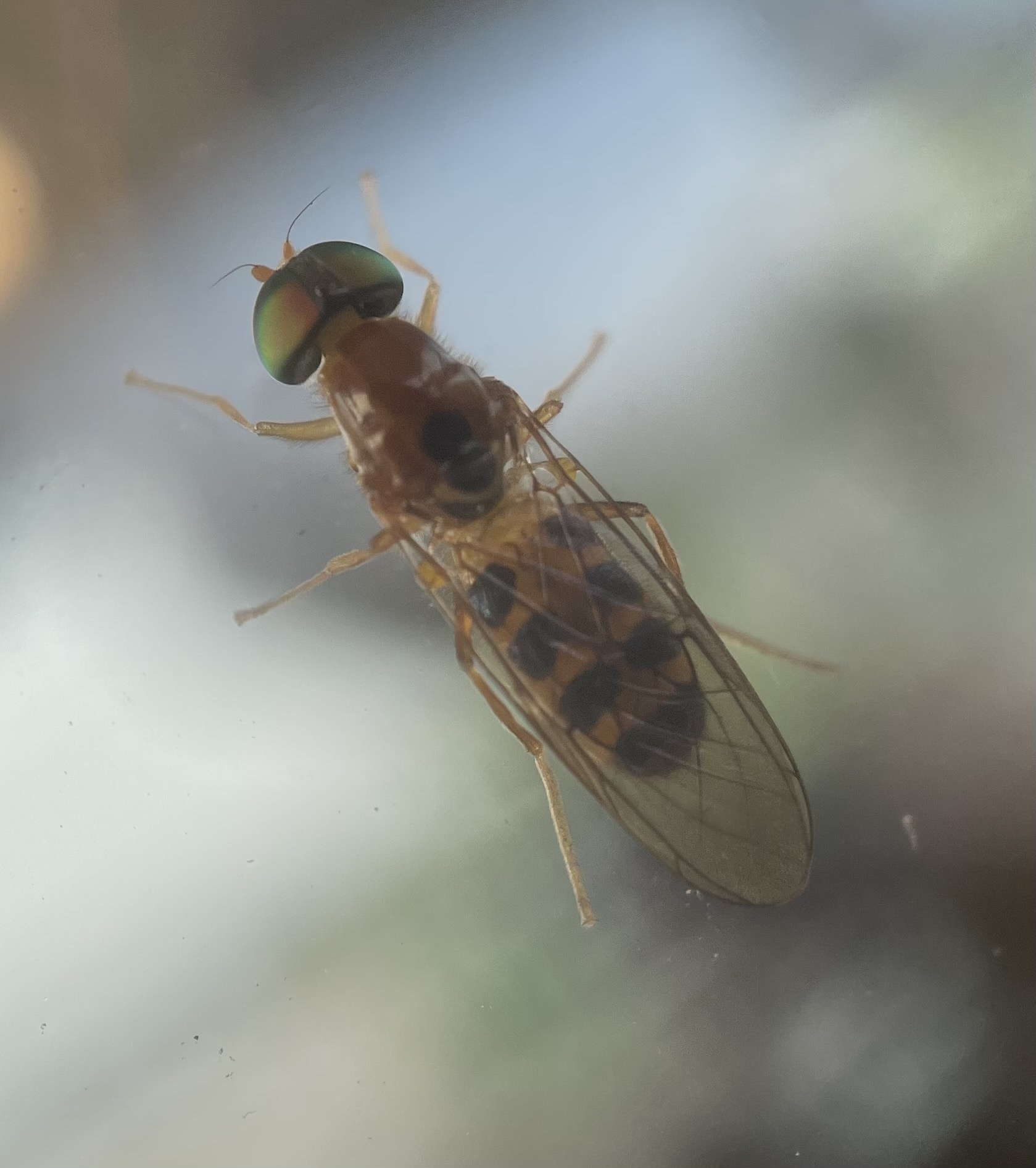

Scientific classification
- Kingdom: Animalia
- Phylum: Arthropoda
- Class: Insecta
- Order: Diptera
- Family: Stratiomyidae
- Subfamily: Sarginae
- Genus: Sargus
- Species: S. elegans

Binomial name
- Sargus elegans Loew, 1866

= Sargus elegans =

Species of fly

Sargus elegans is a species of soldier fly in the family Stratiomyidae.

== Distribution ==
Widespread East Nearctic
