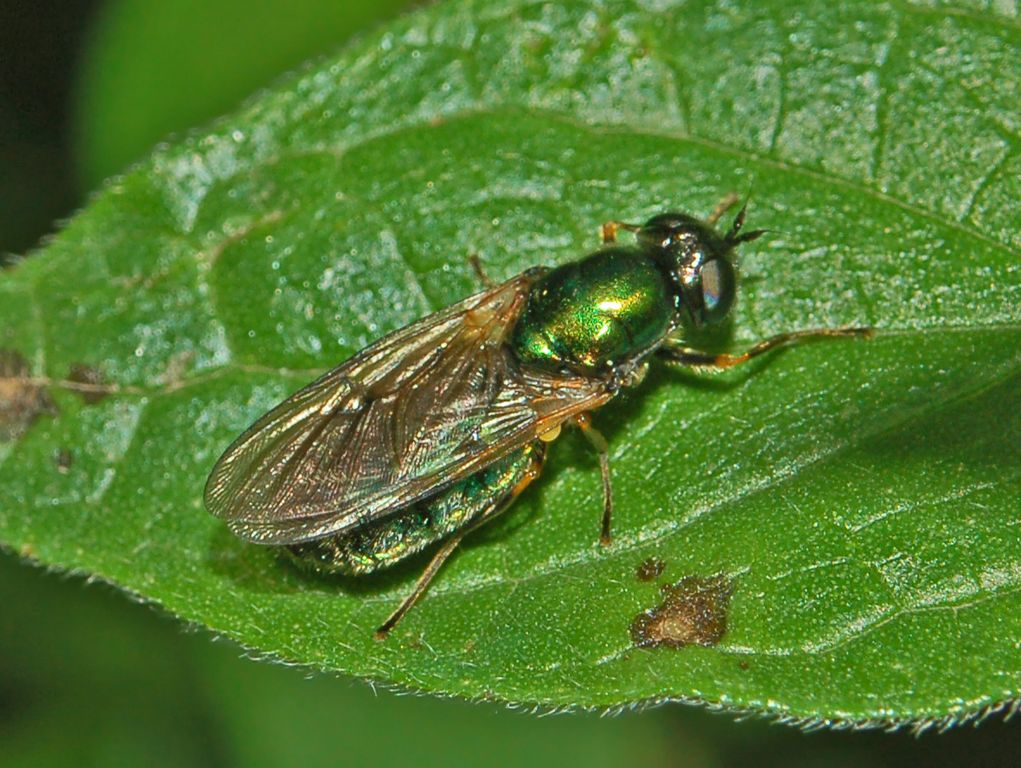
- Chloromyia formosa female

Scientific classification
- Kingdom: Animalia
- Phylum: Arthropoda
- Clade: Pancrustacea
- Class: Insecta
- Order: Diptera
- Family: Stratiomyidae
- Subfamily: Sarginae
- Genus: Chloromyia; Duncan, 1837

Type species
- Musca formosa Scopoli, 1763

Synonyms
- Afrosargus Lindner, 1955; Cloromyia Séguy, 1934

= Chloromyia =

Genus of flies

Chloromyia is a genus of flies in the family Stratiomyidae.

== Species ==
- Chloromyia bella (Loew, 1857)
- Chloromyia caeligera Lindner, 1939
- Chloromyia cingulata Lindner, 1972
- Chloromyia coerulea Yang, Zhang & Li, 2014
- Chloromyia formosa (Scopoli, 1763)
- Chloromyia speciosa (Macquart, 1834)
- Chloromyia tuberculata James, 1952
