= Ptecticus sackenii =

Scientific classification
- Kingdom: Animalia
- Phylum: Arthropoda
- Class: Insecta
- Order: Diptera
- Family: Stratiomyidae
- Subfamily: Sarginae
- Genus: Ptecticus
- Species: P. sackenii

Binomial name
- Ptecticus sackenii Williston, 1885

Species of soldier fly

Ptecticus sackenii is a species of soldier fly in the family Stratiomyidae.

== Distribution ==
Canada, United States.
