= Merosargus par =

Scientific classification
- Kingdom: Animalia
- Phylum: Arthropoda
- Class: Insecta
- Order: Diptera
- Family: Stratiomyidae
- Subfamily: Sarginae
- Genus: Merosargus
- Species: M. par

Binomial name
- Merosargus par Curran, 1932

Species of fly

Merosargus par is a species of soldier fly in the family Stratiomyidae.

== Distribution ==
Mexico], El Salvador, Panama, Belize.
