= Cephalochrysa canadensis =

Scientific classification
- Kingdom: Animalia
- Phylum: Arthropoda
- Class: Insecta
- Order: Diptera
- Family: Stratiomyidae
- Subfamily: Sarginae
- Genus: Cephalochrysa
- Species: C. canadensis

Binomial name
- Cephalochrysa canadensis (Curran, 1927)

Synonyms
- Chrysochroma canadensis Curran, 1927

Species of fly

Cephalochrysa canadensis is a species of soldier fly in the family Stratiomyidae.

== Distribution ==
Canada, United States.
