= Microchrysa congoensis =

Scientific classification
- Kingdom: Animalia
- Phylum: Arthropoda
- Class: Insecta
- Order: Diptera
- Family: Stratiomyidae
- Subfamily: Sarginae
- Genus: Microchrysa
- Species: M. congoensis

Binomial name
- Microchrysa congoensis Lindner, 1938

Species of fly

Microchrysa congoensis is a species of soldier fly in the family Stratiomyidae.

== Distribution ==
Tanzania, Congo
