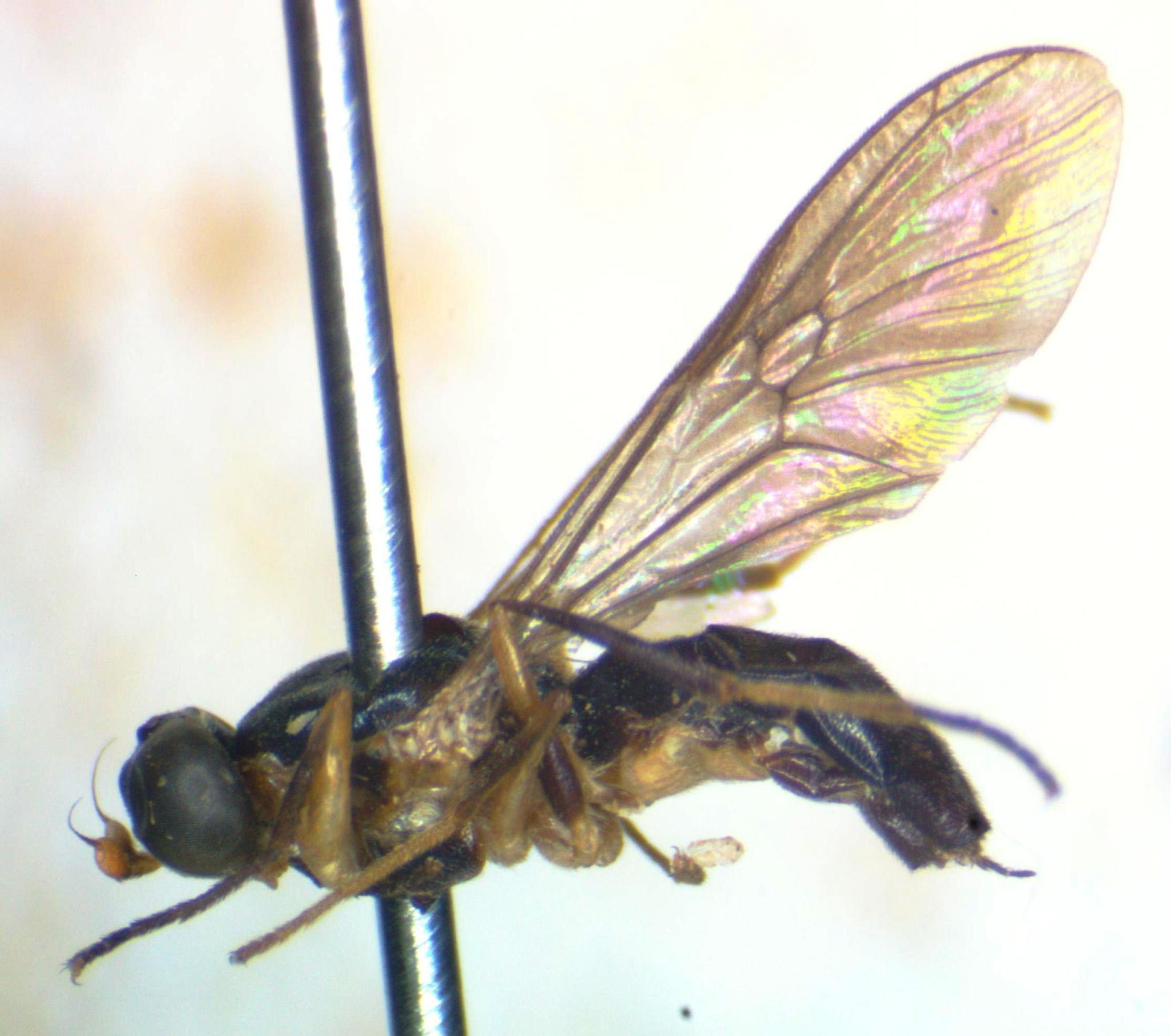

Scientific classification
- Kingdom: Animalia
- Phylum: Arthropoda
- Clade: Pancrustacea
- Class: Insecta
- Order: Diptera
- Family: Stratiomyidae
- Subfamily: Sarginae
- Genus: Merosargus
- Species: M. anticus

Binomial name
- Merosargus anticus Curran, 1932

= Merosargus anticus =

Species of fly

Merosargus anticus is a species of soldier fly in the family Stratiomyidae.

== Distribution ==
Argentina, Costa Rica, Ecuador, Guatemala, Mexico, Peru, Venezuela.
