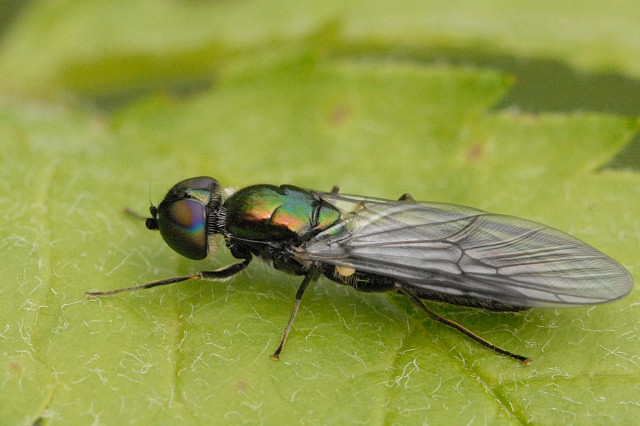

Scientific classification
- Kingdom: Animalia
- Phylum: Arthropoda
- Class: Insecta
- Order: Diptera
- Family: Stratiomyidae
- Subfamily: Sarginae
- Genus: Sargus
- Species: S. iridatus

Binomial name
- Sargus iridatus (Scopoli, 1763)

Synonyms
- Musca indica Harris, 1776; Musca iridata Scopoli, 1763; Sargus indicus (Harris, 1776); Sargus infuscatus Meigen, 1822; Sargus nitidus Meigen, 1822; Musca caerulescens Villers, 1789; Sargus irradatus Schiner, 1855; Sargus coerulescens Bezzi, 1903

= Sargus iridatus =

Species of fly

Sargus iridatus, the iridescent centurion, is a European species of soldier fly.

== Description ==
The body length is 6.0 to 11.0 mm. Like Sargus cuprarius, it is almost entirely purple. It has black antennae, the third segment of the antenna in males being shorter than the second. It has a whitish proboscis; the face and frons are metallic green. There are two clearly delineated white spots at the base of the antennae better developed in females. The thorax has blue reflections. It has black legs, with knees barely paler. The wings are uniformly smoky. It has dirty yellowish halteres. The abdomen is less violet, with black sternites.

== Biology ==
It is found in open and wooded habitats. Larval habitats are in dung, decomposing vegetable matter and compost.

== Distribution ==
Its distribution covers western Europe, northern, and southern Europe, north up to Finland and European Russia.
