= Cephalochrysa similis =

Scientific classification
- Kingdom: Animalia
- Phylum: Arthropoda
- Clade: Pancrustacea
- Class: Insecta
- Order: Diptera
- Family: Stratiomyidae
- Subfamily: Sarginae
- Genus: Cephalochrysa
- Species: C. similis

Binomial name
- Cephalochrysa similis (James, 1936)

Synonyms
- Isosargus similis James, 1936

Species of fly

Cephalochrysa similis is a species of soldier fly in the family Stratiomyidae.

== Distribution ==
United States.
