= Ptecticus concinnus =

Scientific classification
- Kingdom: Animalia
- Phylum: Arthropoda
- Class: Insecta
- Order: Diptera
- Family: Stratiomyidae
- Subfamily: Sarginae
- Genus: Ptecticus
- Species: P. concinnus

Binomial name
- Ptecticus concinnus Williston, 1900

Species of soldier fly

Ptecticus concinnus is a species of soldier fly in the family Stratiomyidae.

== Distribution ==
Mexico.
