= Merosargus frosti =

Scientific classification
- Kingdom: Animalia
- Phylum: Arthropoda
- Class: Insecta
- Order: Diptera
- Family: Stratiomyidae
- Subfamily: Sarginae
- Genus: Merosargus
- Species: M. frosti

Binomial name
- Merosargus frosti James, 1941

Species of fly

Merosargus frosti is a species of soldier fly in the family Stratiomyidae.

== Distribution ==
Ecuador.
