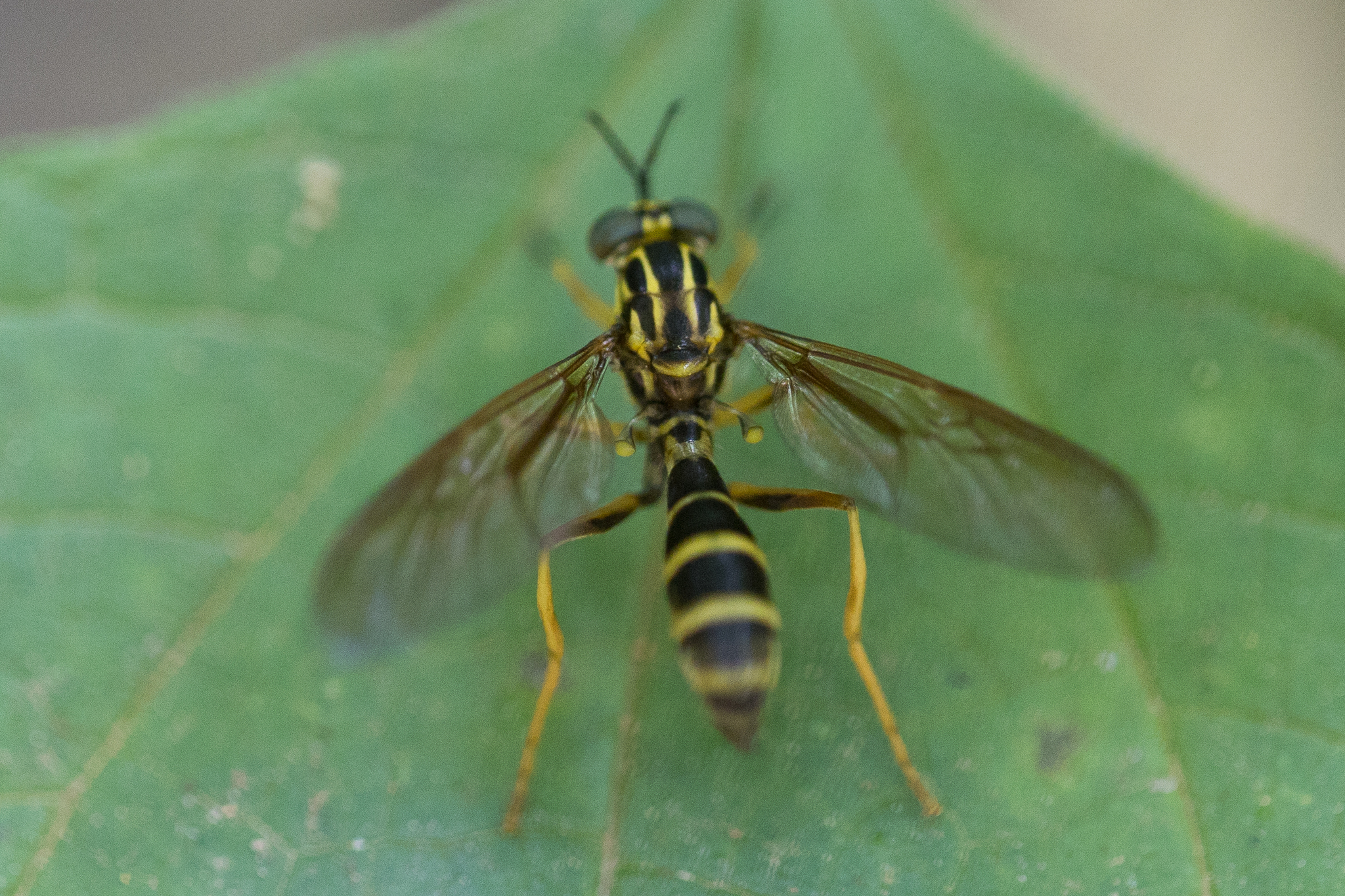
- Acrochaeta fasciata

Scientific classification
- Kingdom: Animalia
- Phylum: Arthropoda
- Clade: Pancrustacea
- Class: Insecta
- Order: Diptera
- Family: Stratiomyidae
- Subfamily: Sarginae
- Genus: Acrochaeta; Wiedemann, 1830

Type species
- Acrochaeta fasciata Wiedemann, 1830

Synonyms
- Acrochoeta Macquart, 1834; Compsosoma Brauer, 1882; Achrochaeta Giglio-Tos, 1893

= Acrochaeta =

Genus of flies

Acrochaeta is a genus of flies in the family Stratiomyidae.

== Species ==
- Acrochaeta adusta Lindner, 1949
- Acrochaeta asapha Fachin & Amorim, 2015
- Acrochaeta balbii Fachin & Amorim, 2015
- Acrochaeta convexifrons (McFadden, 1971)
- Acrochaeta dichrostyla Fachin & Amorim, 2015
- Acrochaeta dimidiata Lindner, 1949
- Acrochaeta fasciata Wiedemann, 1830
- Acrochaeta mexicana Lindner, 1949
- Acrochaeta polychaeta Fachin & Amorim, 2015
- Acrochaeta pseudofasciata Fachin & Amorim, 2015
- Acrochaeta pseudopolychaeta Fachin & Amorim, 2015
- Acrochaeta rhombostyla Fachin & Amorim, 2015
- Acrochaeta ruscfhii Fachin & Amorim, 2015
- Acrochaeta stigmata Fachin & Amorim, 2015
