= Formosargus =

Scientific classification
- Kingdom: Animalia
- Phylum: Arthropoda
- Class: Insecta
- Order: Diptera
- Family: Stratiomyidae
- Subfamily: Sarginae
- Genus: Formosargus; James, 1939

Type species
- Formosargus kerteszi James, 1939

Synonyms
- Amsaria Adisoemarto, 1974

Genus of flies

Formosargus is a genus of flies in the family Stratiomyidae.

== Species ==
- Formosargus berezovskiyi Fachin & Hauser, 2022
- Formosargus borneensis Fachin & Hauser, 2022
- Formosargus kerteszi James, 1939
- Formosargus lineata (Meijere, 1913)
- Formosargus mangoleensis Fachin & Hauser, 2022
- Formosargus sagittocera (Adisoemarto, 1974)
- Formosargus trivittatus Fachin & Hauser, 2022
- Formosargus variegatus James, 1969
- Formosargus woodleyi Fachin & Hauser, 2022
