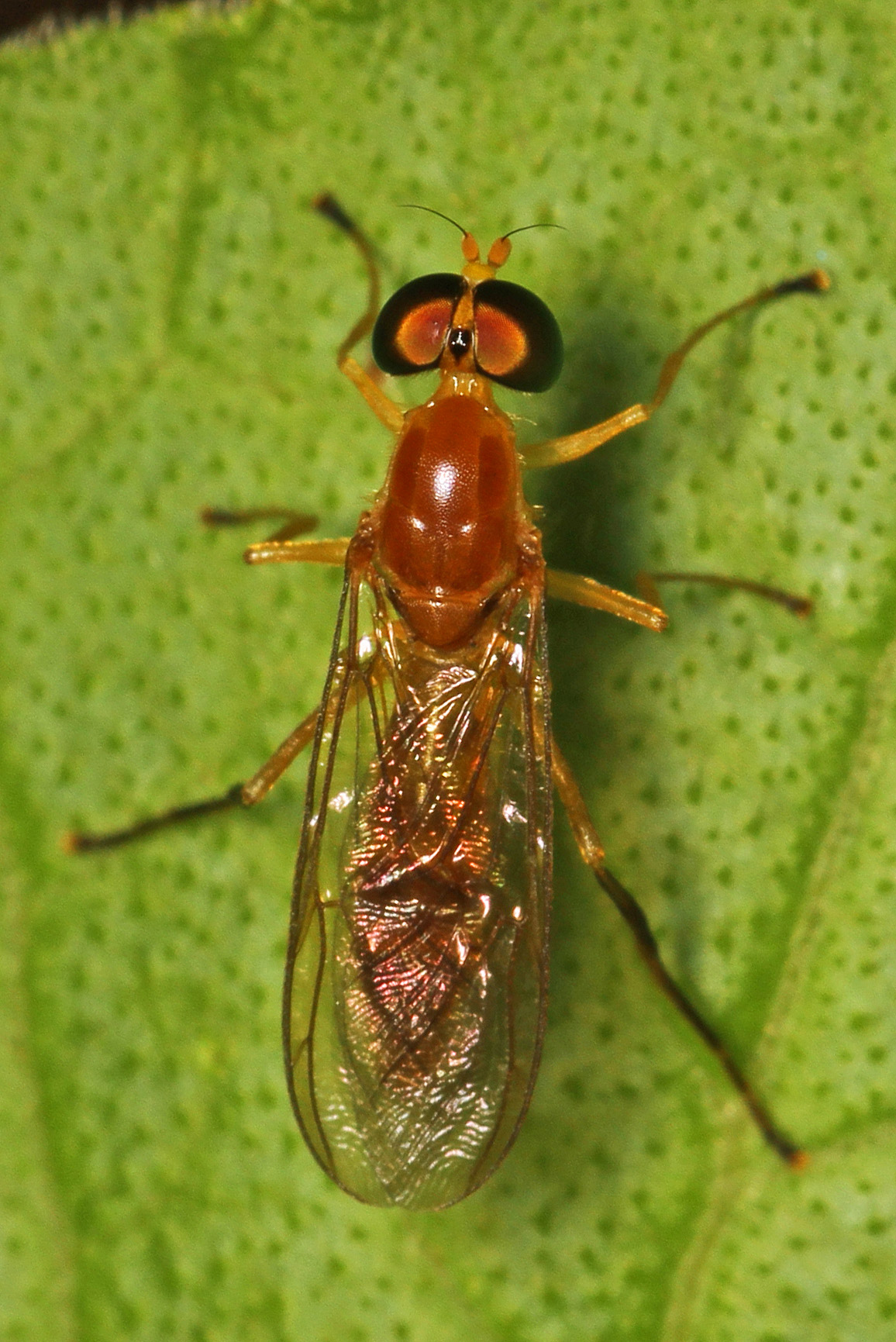

Scientific classification
- Kingdom: Animalia
- Phylum: Arthropoda
- Class: Insecta
- Order: Diptera
- Family: Stratiomyidae
- Subfamily: Sarginae
- Genus: Ptecticus
- Species: P. trivittatus

Binomial name
- Ptecticus trivittatus (Say, 1829)

Synonyms
- Sargus trivittatus Say, 1829; Ptecticus similis Williston, 1885; Ptecticus trivittatus subsp. melanopus James, 1941

= Ptecticus trivittatus =

Species of fly

Ptecticus trivittatus is a species of soldier fly in the family Stratiomyidae.

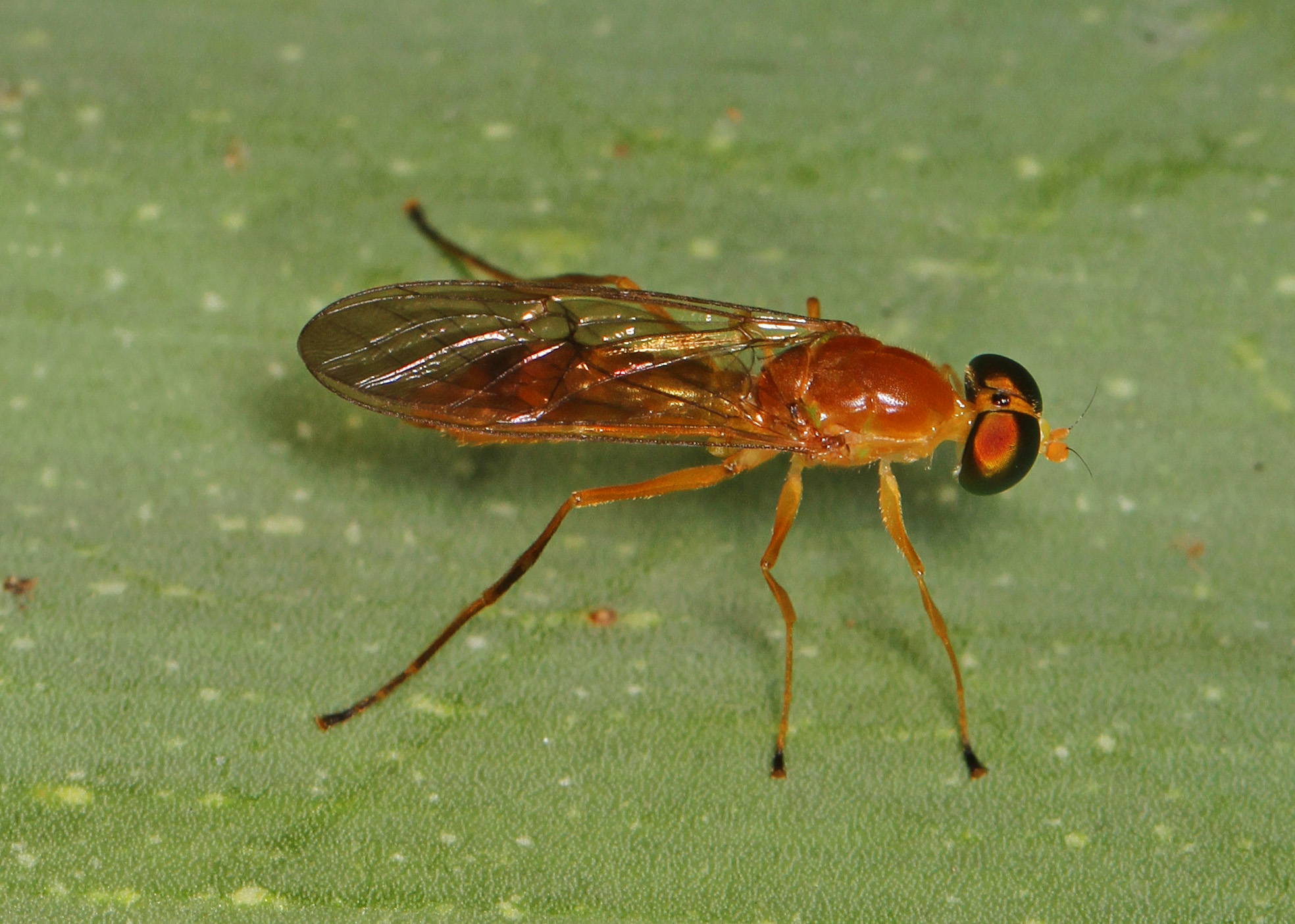

== Distribution ==
United States.
