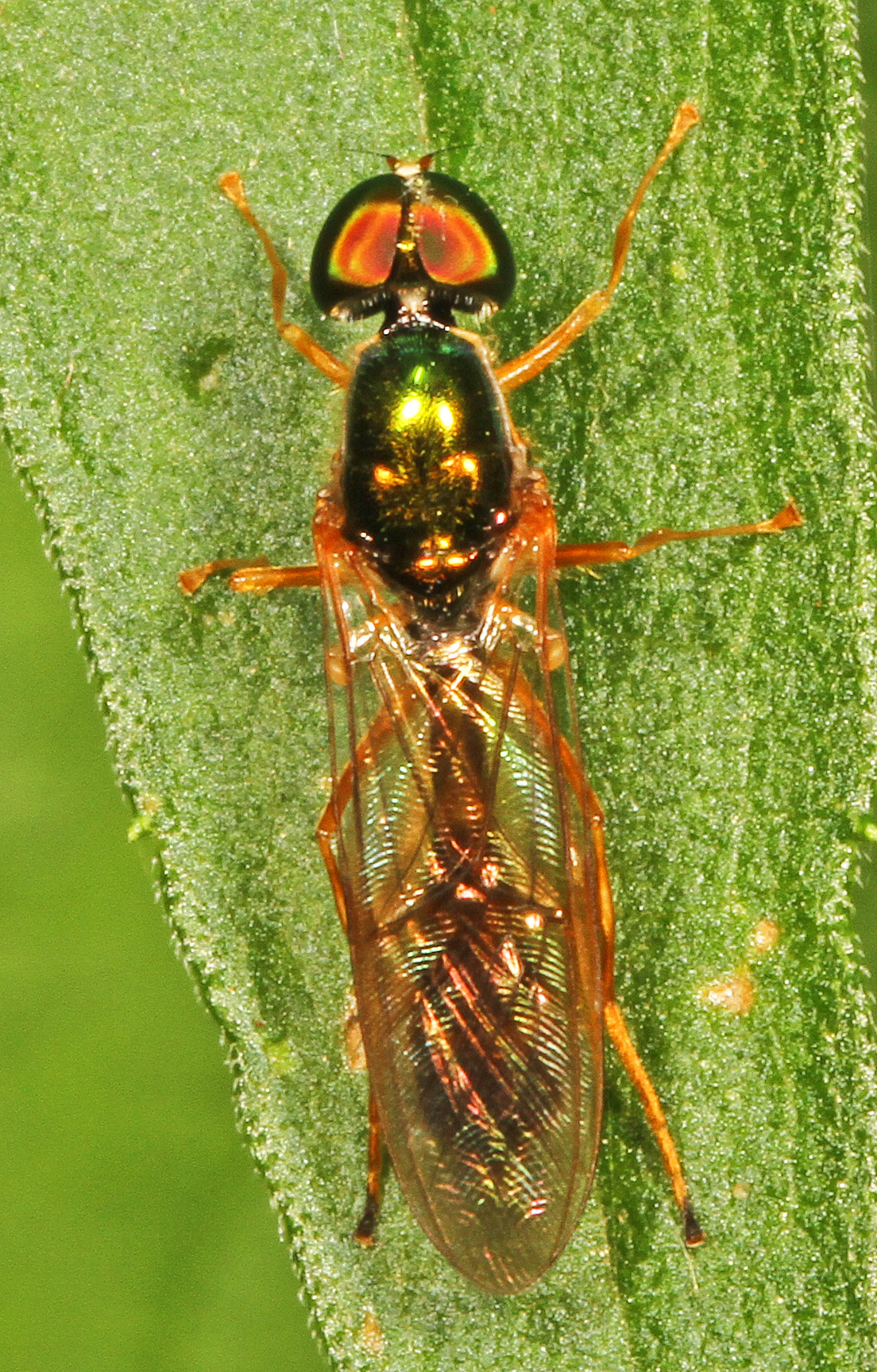

Scientific classification
- Kingdom: Animalia
- Phylum: Arthropoda
- Class: Insecta
- Order: Diptera
- Family: Stratiomyidae
- Genus: Sargus
- Species: S. fasciatus

Binomial name
- Sargus fasciatus Fabricius, 1805

Synonyms
- Macrosargus clavis Williston, 1885; Pedicella schwarzi Curran, 1928; Sargus coarctatus Macquart, 1838; Sargus debilis Walker, 1851; Sargus lucens Loew, 1866; Sargus notatus Wiedemann, 1830; Sargus sallei Bellardi, 1859; Sargus tricolor Loew, 1866; Sargus versicolor Bellardi, 1862

= Sargus fasciatus =

Species of fly

Sargus fasciatus is a species of soldier fly in the family Stratiomyidae.

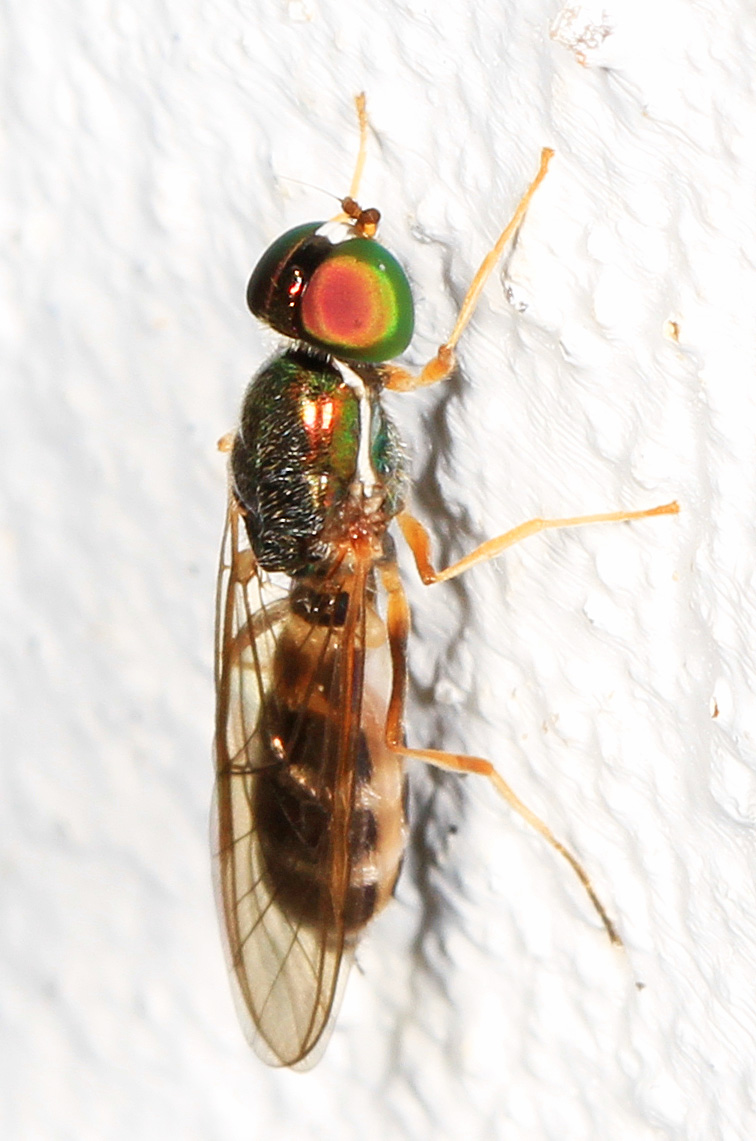
