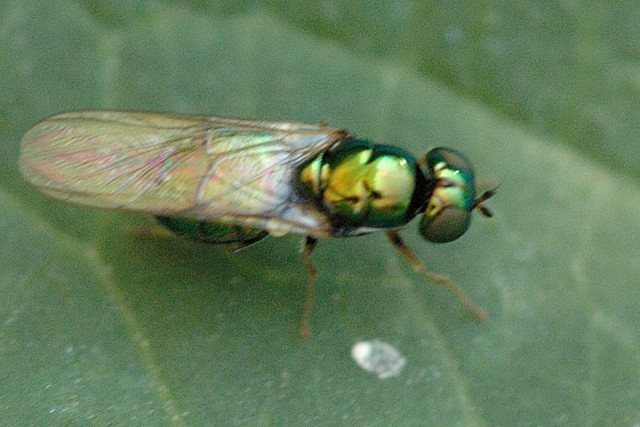
- Microchrysa polita female

Scientific classification
- Kingdom: Animalia
- Phylum: Arthropoda
- Clade: Pancrustacea
- Class: Insecta
- Order: Diptera
- Family: Stratiomyidae
- Subfamily: Sarginae
- Genus: Microchrysa; Loew, 1855

Type species
- Musca polita Linnaeus, 1758

Synonyms
- Chrysomyia Macquart, 1834; ClorisomaRóndani, 1856; ChrysomyaRóndani, 1856; ChlorisomaCosta, 1857; ChrysomyzaZetterstedt, 1859; ClorosiaRóndani, 1861; ChlorosiaRóndani, 1861; ChlorisomaRóndani, 1861; MyochrysaRóndani, 1861; MyochrysaRóndani, 1863; MicrochryzaBigot, 1879; ChlorosomaVerrall, 1882; MyiochrysaScudder, 1882; MyochrisaBigot, 1887; PsaroniusEnderlein, 1914; PsaroninusEnderlein, 1937; MichrochrysaÔuchi, 1940; MychrochrysaCsiby & Toth, 1981; ChrymichrosaMason, 1997

= Microchrysa =

Genus of flies

Microchrysa is a genus of soldierfly belonging to the family Stratiomyidae. There has been some confusion with the synonym Chrysomyia of Macquart, 1834, causing some members of the genus Chrysomya of Robineau-Desvoidy, 1830 to be placed erroneously in this genus.

== Species ==
- Microchrysa alessandrinorum Mason, 1997
- Microchrysa arabica Hauser, 2008
- Microchrysa bicolor (Wiedemann, 1830)
- Microchrysa bipars (Walker, 1861)
- Microchrysa calopa Brunetti, 1912
- Microchrysa calopus Brunetti, 1907
- Microchrysa circumscripta Loew, 1857
- Microchrysa congoensis Lindner, 1938
- Microchrysa cyaneiventris (Zetterstedt, 1842)
- Microchrysa daccordii Mason, 1997
- Microchrysa deconinckae Mason, 1997
- Microchrysa dichoptica James, 1957
- Microchrysa dispar Schiner, 1868
- Microchrysa edwardsi Lindner, 1939
- Microchrysa elmari Lindner, 1960
- Microchrysa flavicornis (Meigen, 1822)
- Microchrysa flaviventris (Wiedemann, 1824)
- Microchrysa flavomarginata Meijere, 1910
- Microchrysa fuscistigma Meijere, 1913
- Microchrysa ghesquierei Lindner, 1938
- Microchrysa inversa Lindner, 1938
- Microchrysa japonica Nagatomi, 1975
- Microchrysa laodunensis Pleske, 1926
- Microchrysa latifrons (Williston, 1900)
- Microchrysa loewi Lindner, 1938
- Microchrysa macula (Fabricius, 1805)
- Microchrysa matengoensis Lindner, 1943
- Microchrysa mokanshanensis Ôuchi, 1938
- Microchrysa nigrimacula Nagatomi, 1975
- Microchrysa nova Giglio-Tos, 1891
- Microchrysa obscuriventris McFadden, 1982
- Microchrysa polita (Linnaeus, 1758)
- Microchrysa rozkosnyi Mason, 1997
- Microchrysa ruffoi Mason, 1997
- Microchrysa ruwenzoriensis Lindner, 1938
- Microchrysa scutellaris Loew, 1857
- Microchrysa stuckenbergi Mason, 1997
- Microchrysa ussuriana (Pleske, 1930)
- Microchrysa vertebrata Lindner, 1955
- Microchrysa viridis (Enderlein, 1914)
- Microchrysa woodleyi Mason, 1997
