= Sargus maculatus =

Scientific classification
- Kingdom: Animalia
- Phylum: Arthropoda
- Class: Insecta
- Order: Diptera
- Family: Stratiomyidae
- Subfamily: Sarginae
- Genus: Sargus
- Species: S. maculatus

Binomial name
- Sargus maculatus (Lindner, 1936)

Synonyms
- Geosargus maculatus Lindner, 1936

Species of fly

Sargus maculatus is a European species of soldier fly.

== Distribution ==
Sargus maculatus can be found in Cyprus and Israel.
