= Microsargus =

Scientific classification
- Kingdom: Animalia
- Phylum: Arthropoda
- Class: Insecta
- Order: Diptera
- Family: Stratiomyidae
- Subfamily: Sarginae
- Genus: Microsargus; Lindner, 1958

Type species
- Microsargus stuckenbergi Lindner, 1958

Genus of flies

Microsargus is a genus of flies in the family Stratiomyidae.

== Species ==
- Microsargus stuckenbergi Lindner, 1958
