= Paraptecticus =

Scientific classification
- Kingdom: Animalia
- Phylum: Arthropoda
- Class: Insecta
- Order: Diptera
- Family: Stratiomyidae
- Subfamily: Sarginae
- Genus: Paraptecticus; Grünberg, 1915

Type species
- Paraptecticus viduatus Grünberg, 1915

Genus of flies

Paraptecticus is a genus of flies in the family Stratiomyidae.

== Species ==
- Paraptecticus viduatus Grünberg, 1915
