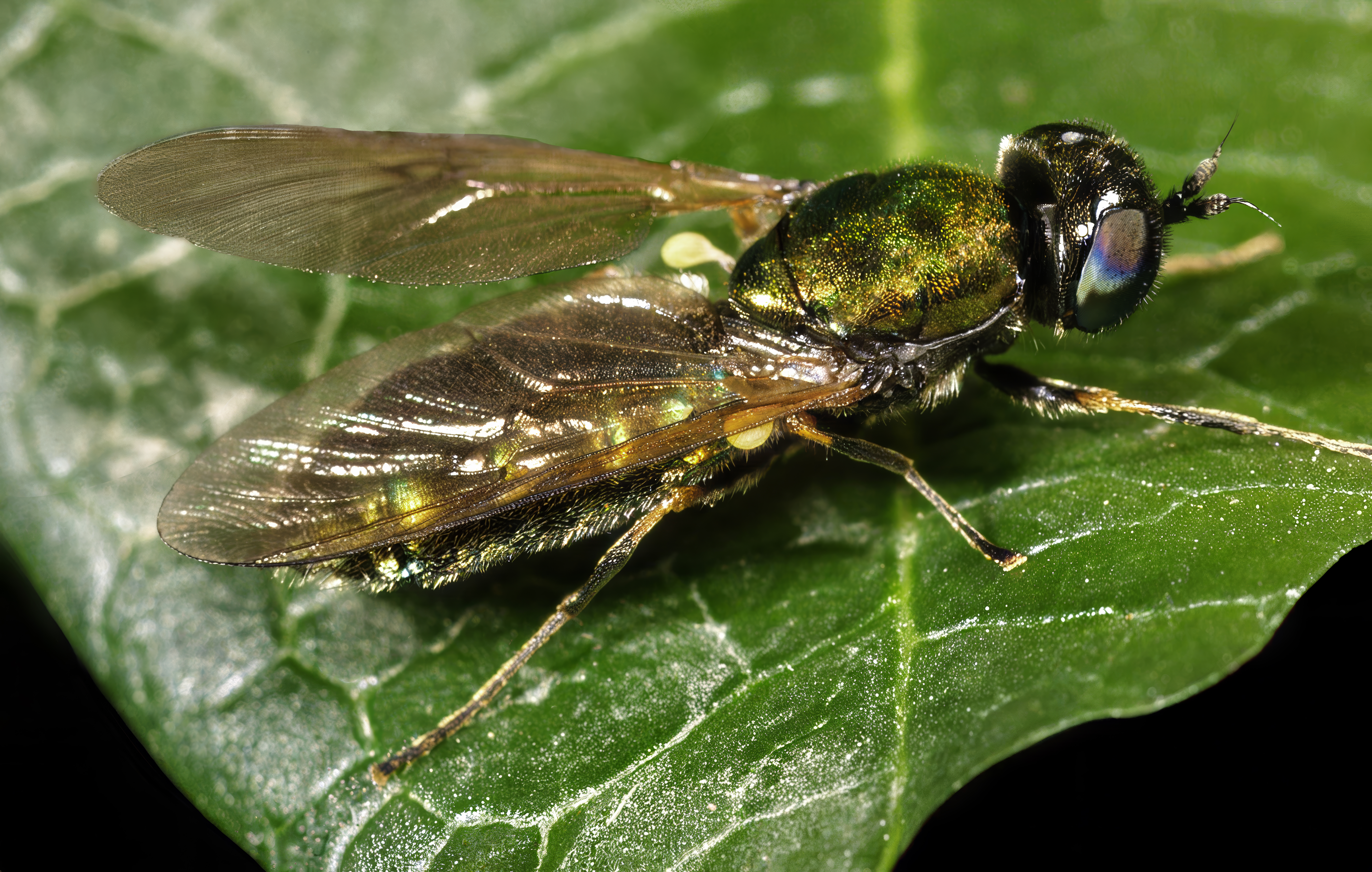
- Chloromyia formosa ♂
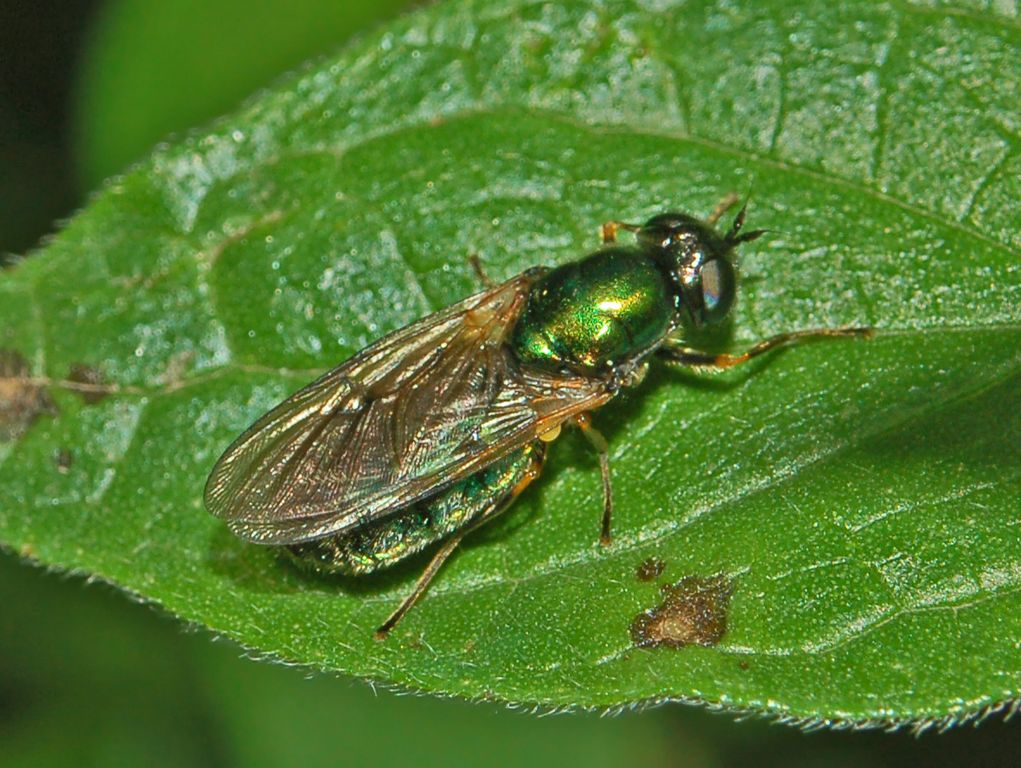
- Chloromyia formosa ♀

Scientific classification
- Kingdom: Animalia
- Phylum: Arthropoda
- Class: Insecta
- Order: Diptera
- Family: Stratiomyidae
- Subfamily: Sarginae
- Genus: Chloromyia
- Species: C. formosa

Binomial name
- Chloromyia formosa (Scopoli, 1763)

Synonyms
- List: Musca formosa Scopoli, 1763; Nemotelus flavogeniculatus De Geer, 1776; Musca cicur Harris, 1776; Musca aurata Fabricius, 1787; Sargus xanthopterus Meigen, 1804; Sargus aeneus Walckenaer, 1802; Sargus azureus Loew, 1840

= Chloromyia formosa =

Species of fly

Chloromyia formosa is a species of soldier flies belonging to the family Stratiomyidae. Another name for it is Broad centurion.

== Distribution ==
This species is present in most of Europe (Austria, Belgium, Bulgaria, Czech Republic, Denmark, Finland, France, Germany, Greece, Ireland, Italy, Luxembourg, Netherlands, Norway, Poland, Russia, Spain, Sweden, Switzerland, United Kingdom), in the Near East, in the Nearctic realm, and in North Africa.

== Habitat ==
These flies mainly inhabit wooded areas, hedge rows, moist forests, wet meadows, parks and gardens.

== Description ==
Chloromyia formosa can reach a length of 7.3–9 millimetres (0.29–0.35 in) and a wing length of 6–7 millimetres (0.24–0.28 in). Their body is elongated, the thorax is metallic green, the head is hemispherical without hair, while the eyes are quite hairy. Antennae are short, the first antennal segment is longer than the second. The legs are black, only the knees are yellow. The abdomen is flattened and broad.

An evident dimorphism exists between the males and the females of this species. In females the abdomen is blue-green with a purple sheen (depending on the light), while in males it shows a copper-green sheen. The female's eyes are separated from each other. The wings are yellowish-brown.

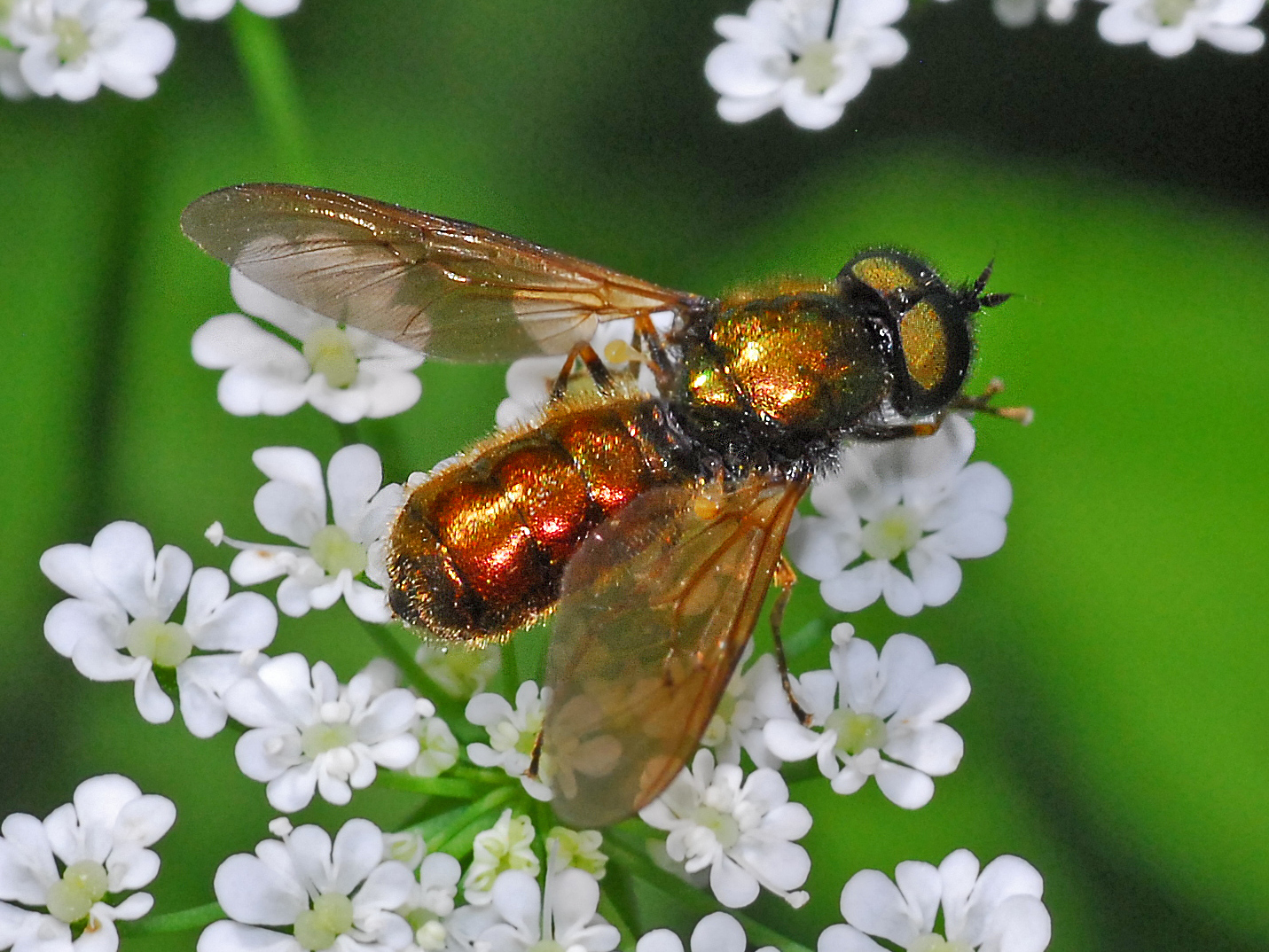
Male, with copper-green abdomen

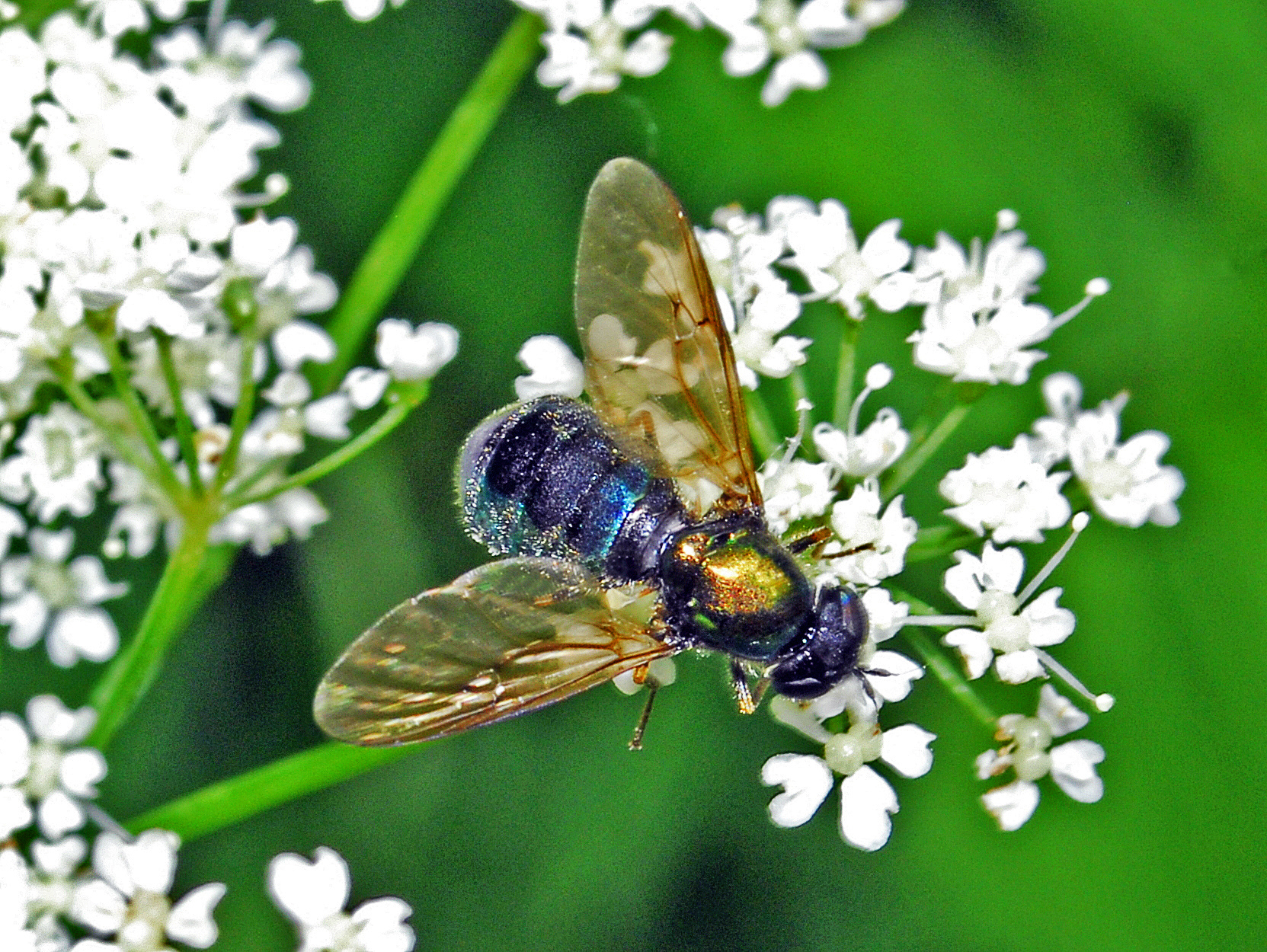
Female, with blue-green abdomen

== Biology ==
Adults can mostly be encountered from April through August, feeding on nectar of flowers (mainly of Apiaceae species) and on pollen of Filipendula ulmaria (Rosaceae). Between April and August these insects mate several times. The larvae develop in humus-rich soil, feeding on dead leaves and other decaying vegetal substances. After reaching the final stage larvae overwinter.

== Bibliography ==
- Gibson, R. H., Nelson, I. L., Hopkins G. W., Hamlett, B. J., Memmott J. (2006). Pollinator webs, plant communities and the conservation of rare plants: arable weeds as a case study. Journal of Applied Ecology 43: 246—257
- Mason, F., Rozkošný, R., Hauser, M. (2009). A review of the soldier flies (Diptera: Stratiomyidae) of Sardinia. Zootaxa 2318: 507–530
- Nartshuk, E. P. (2009). The character of soldier fly distribution (Diptera, Stratiomyidae) in Eastern Europe. Entomological review 89(1): 46-55. DOI:10.1134/S0013873809010072
- Rozkošný, R. 1998. Chapter 24. Family Stratiomyidae. Manual Palaearct. Dipt. 2: 387-411.
