= Sargus rufipes =

Scientific classification
- Kingdom: Animalia
- Phylum: Arthropoda
- Class: Insecta
- Order: Diptera
- Family: Stratiomyidae
- Subfamily: Sarginae
- Genus: Sargus
- Species: S. rufipes

Binomial name
- Sargus rufipes Wahlberg, 1854

Species of fly

Sargus rufipes is a European species of soldier fly.

== Distribution ==
Sargus rufipes can be found in Finland, Germany, Norway, Russia, Sweden, and Switzerland.
