= Otochrysa =

Scientific classification
- Kingdom: Animalia
- Phylum: Arthropoda
- Class: Insecta
- Order: Diptera
- Family: Stratiomyidae
- Subfamily: Sarginae
- Genus: Otochrysa; Lindner, 1938

Type species
- Otochrysa bicolor Lindner, 1938

Genus of flies

Otochrysa is a genus of flies in the family Stratiomyidae.

== Species ==
- Otochrysa bicolor Lindner, 1938
