= Microptecticus =

Scientific classification
- Kingdom: Animalia
- Phylum: Arthropoda
- Class: Insecta
- Order: Diptera
- Family: Stratiomyidae
- Subfamily: Sarginae
- Genus: Microptecticus; Lindner, 1936

Type species
- Microptecticus dimidiatus Lindner, 1936

Genus of flies

Microptecticus is a genus of flies in the family Stratiomyidae.

== Species ==
- Microptecticus ambiguus Lindner, 1966
- Microptecticus dimidiatus Lindner, 1936
- Microptecticus magnicornis (Lindner, 1936)
- Microptecticus nigricoxa (Lindner, 1936)
