= Lobisquama =

Scientific classification
- Kingdom: Animalia
- Phylum: Arthropoda
- Class: Insecta
- Order: Diptera
- Family: Stratiomyidae
- Subfamily: Sarginae
- Genus: Lobisquama; James, 1982

Type species
- Lobisquama barbata James, 1982

Genus of flies

Lobisquama is a genus of flies in the family Stratiomyidae.

== Species ==
- Lobisquama barbata James, 1982
