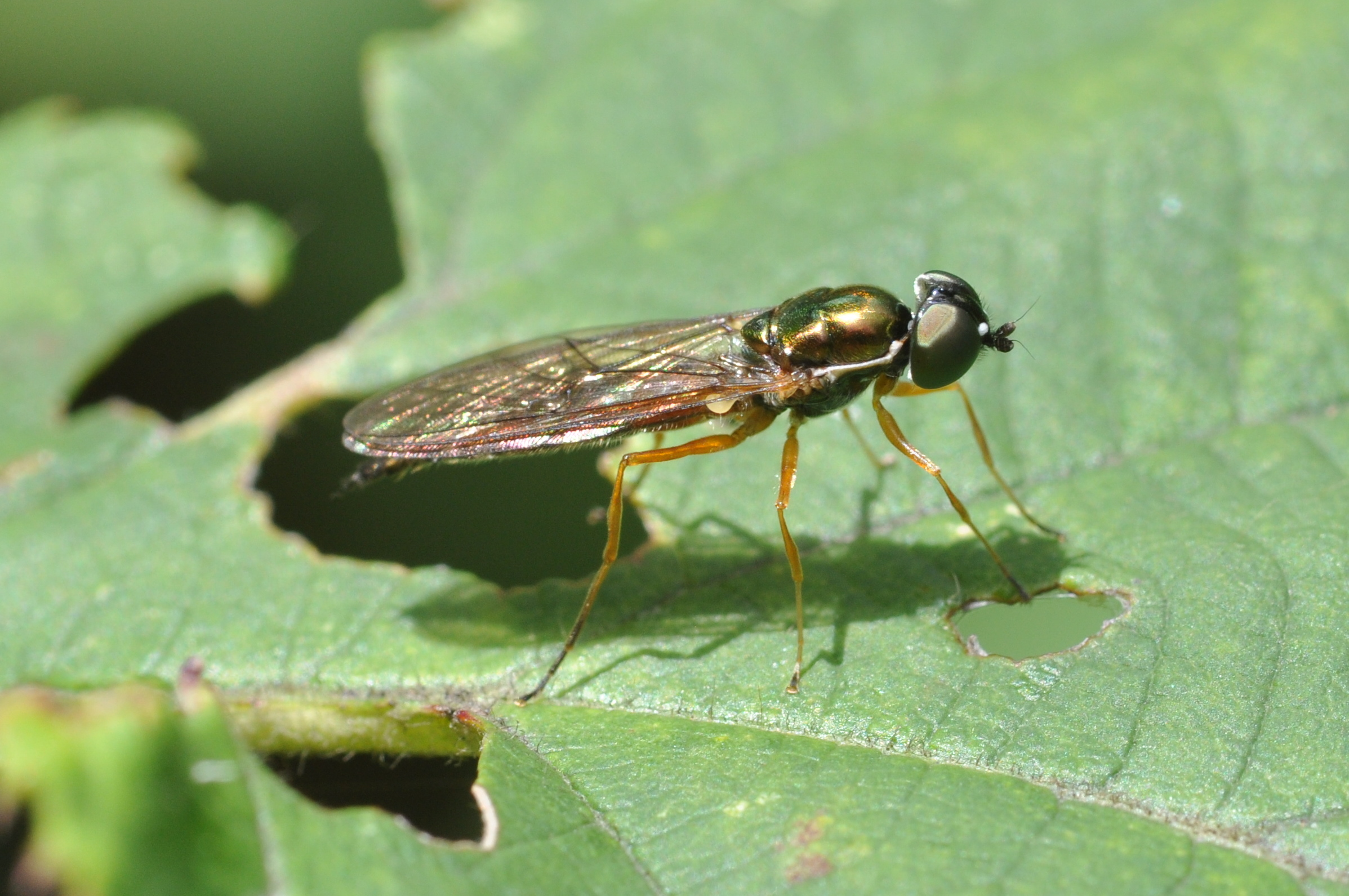

Scientific classification
- Kingdom: Animalia
- Phylum: Arthropoda
- Class: Insecta
- Order: Diptera
- Family: Stratiomyidae
- Subfamily: Sarginae
- Genus: Sargus
- Species: S. bipunctatus

Binomial name
- Sargus bipunctatus (Scopoli, 1763)

Synonyms
- Musca bipunctata Scopoli, 1763; Sargus reaumuri Meigen, 1804

= Sargus bipunctatus =

Species of fly

Sargus bipunctatus, the twin-spot centurion, is a European species of soldier fly.

== Description ==
Body length 10 to 14 mm. Frons less broad than in Sargus cuprarius. The mesonotum is metallic green; the abdomen brown, with a violet metallic tinge. Females have a broader build than the slender males with the base of the abdomen extensively reddish and a blackish tip bearing blue reflections. Wings slightly yellow. Red legs, tarsi brown at the apex.

== Biology ==
Found in open and wooded habitats, sunbathing on foliage in sheltered spots. The flight period is from July to November. Females lay eggs on fresh dung, manure or in close by soil where the larvae develop. The larvae have been reared from cow dung, compost, rotting vegetation and decaying fungi. Larvae have been found in egg pods of locusts (Dociostaurus maroccanus Shnb.).

== Distribution ==
Sargus bipunctatus can be found in the Trans-Caucasus Central belt and south of Western Europe.
