= Gongrosargus =

Scientific classification
- Kingdom: Animalia
- Phylum: Arthropoda
- Class: Insecta
- Order: Diptera
- Family: Stratiomyidae
- Subfamily: Sarginae
- Genus: Gongrosargus; Lindner, 1959

Type species
- Gongrosargus stuckenbergi Lindner, 1959

Synonyms
- Dinosargus Lindner, 1968

Genus of flies

Gongrosargus is a genus of flies in the family Stratiomyidae.

== Species ==
- Gongrosargus distinguendus Lindner, 1966
- Gongrosargus exclamationis Lindner, 1968
- Gongrosargus flavipennis (Macquart, 1838)
- Gongrosargus lateritius (Lindner, 1968)
- Gongrosargus maculipennis (Lindner, 1936)
- Gongrosargus niveitarsalis Lindner, 1966
- Gongrosargus pallidus (Macquart, 1838)
- Gongrosargus pauliani Lindner, 1966
- Gongrosargus stuckenbergi Lindner, 1959
- Gongrosargus superpictus Lindner, 1966
- Gongrosargus viridenotatus Lindner, 1966
