= Filiptschenkia =

Scientific classification
- Kingdom: Animalia
- Phylum: Arthropoda
- Class: Insecta
- Order: Diptera
- Family: Stratiomyidae
- Subfamily: Sarginae
- Genus: Filiptschenkia; Pleske, 1926

Type species
- Filiptschenkia sargoides Pleske, 1926

Genus of flies

Filiptschenkia is a genus of flies in the family Stratiomyidae.

== Species ==
- Filiptschenkia sargoides Pleske, 1926
