= Cephalochrysa =

Scientific classification
- Kingdom: Animalia
- Phylum: Arthropoda
- Class: Insecta
- Order: Diptera
- Family: Stratiomyidae
- Subfamily: Sarginae
- Genus: Cephalochrysa; Kertész, 1912

Type species
- Sargus hovas Bigot, 1859

Synonyms
- Isosargus James, 1936; Parasargus Lindner, 1935

Genus of flies

Cephalochrysa is a genus of flies in the family Stratiomyidae.

== Species ==
- Cephalochrysa africana (Lindner, 1935)
- Cephalochrysa albisquama (Enderlein, 1914)
- Cephalochrysa australis (Bigot, 1859)
- Cephalochrysa bigoti (Lindner, 1968)
- Cephalochrysa calopa (Bigot, 1879)
- Cephalochrysa canadensis (Curran, 1927)
- Cephalochrysa chrysidiformis (Lindner, 1937)
- Cephalochrysa demeijerei (Lindner, 1937)
- Cephalochrysa ferruginea (Enderlein, 1914)
- Cephalochrysa flava (Lindner, 1968)
- Cephalochrysa flavomarginata Speiser, 1920
- Cephalochrysa fortunata (Lindner, 1966)
- Cephalochrysa gracilis James, 1962
- Cephalochrysa hovas (Bigot, 1859)
- Cephalochrysa infuscata James, 1950
- Cephalochrysa lapida (Lindner, 1966)
- Cephalochrysa lata (Lindner, 1966)
- Cephalochrysa lucens (Lindner, 1968)
- Cephalochrysa matilei (Lindner, 1979)
- Cephalochrysa maxima (Bezzi, 1928)
- Cephalochrysa nigra James, 1962
- Cephalochrysa nigricornis (Loew, 1866)
- Cephalochrysa rufibasis (Walker, 1860)
- Cephalochrysa rugulosa James, 1962
- Cephalochrysa sapphirina (Walker, 1849)
- Cephalochrysa similis (James, 1936)
- Cephalochrysa stenogaster James, 1939
- Cephalochrysa stigmatica (Wulp, 1898)
- Cephalochrysa texana (Melander, 1904)
- Cephalochrysa triste (Lindner, 1966)
- Cephalochrysa turbidum (Lindner, 1965)
- Cephalochrysa vadoni (Lindner, 1966)
