= Ptecticus testaceus =

Scientific classification
- Kingdom: Animalia
- Phylum: Arthropoda
- Class: Insecta
- Order: Diptera
- Family: Stratiomyidae
- Subfamily: Sarginae
- Genus: Ptecticus
- Species: P. testaceus

Binomial name
- Ptecticus testaceus (Fabricius, 1805

Synonyms
- Musca elongata Fabricius, 1794; Sargus testaceus Fabricius, 1805; Ptecticus testaceous James & McFadden, 1982

Species of soldier fly

Ptecticus testaceus is a species of soldier fly in the family Stratiomyidae.

== Distribution ==
Argentina, Belize, Brazil, Costa Rica, Honduras, Mexico, Panama.
