= Sargus viridis =

Scientific classification
- Kingdom: Animalia
- Phylum: Arthropoda
- Class: Insecta
- Order: Diptera
- Family: Stratiomyidae
- Subfamily: Sarginae
- Genus: Sargus
- Species: S. viridis

Binomial name
- Sargus viridis Say, 1823

Synonyms
- Actina viridis (Say, 1824); Sargus frontalis Loew, 1855; Sargus nigribarbis Bigot, 1879; Myochrisa caerulea Bigot, 1887; Chloromyia coerulea Kertész, 1908

Species of fly

Sargus viridis is a species of soldier fly in the family Stratiomyidae.

== Distribution ==
Widespread Canada and United States.
