= Stackelbergia =

Scientific classification
- Kingdom: Animalia
- Phylum: Arthropoda
- Class: Insecta
- Order: Diptera
- Family: Stratiomyidae
- Subfamily: Sarginae
- Genus: Stackelbergia; Pleske, 1930

Type species
- Stackelbergia chloromyioides Pleske, 1930

Genus of flies

Stackelbergia is a genus of flies in the family Stratiomyidae.

== Species ==
- Stackelbergia chloromyioides Pleske, 1930
