= Chrysochromioides =

Scientific classification
- Kingdom: Animalia
- Phylum: Arthropoda
- Class: Insecta
- Order: Diptera
- Family: Stratiomyidae
- Subfamily: Sarginae
- Genus: Chrysochromioides; Brunetti, 1926

Type species
- Chrysochromioides micropunctata Brunetti, 1926

Genus of flies

Chrysochromioides is a genus of flies in the family Stratiomyidae.

== Species ==
- Chrysochromioides micropunctata Brunetti, 1926
