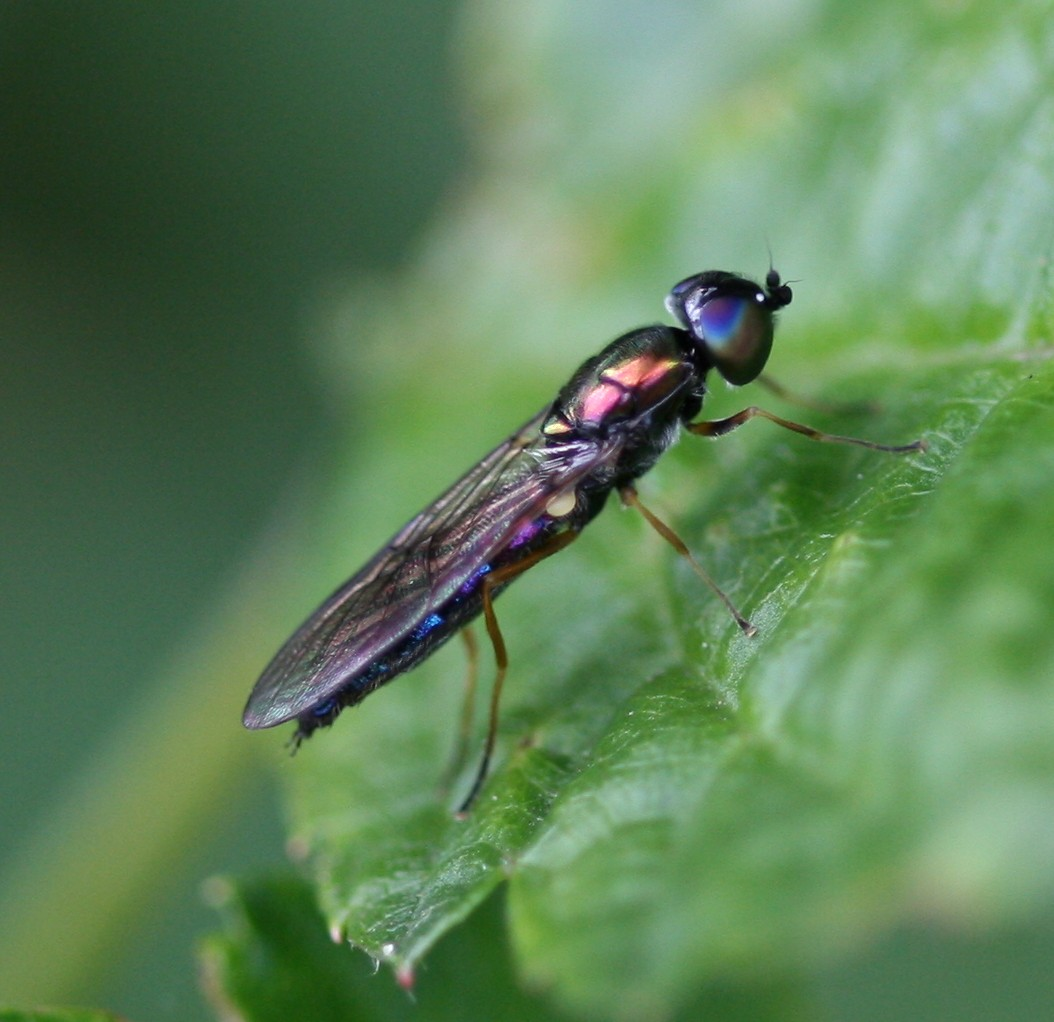

Scientific classification
- Kingdom: Animalia
- Phylum: Arthropoda
- Class: Insecta
- Order: Diptera
- Family: Stratiomyidae
- Subfamily: Sarginae
- Genus: Sargus
- Species: S. flavipes

Binomial name
- Sargus flavipes Meigen, 1822

Synonyms
- Sargus minimus Zetterstedt, 1849; Sargus andreas Walker, 1849; Sargus angustifrons Loew, 1855; Sargus nitidus Verrall, 1909; Sargus rufipes Verrall, 1909

= Sargus flavipes =

Species of fly

Sargus flavipes, the yellow-legged centurion, is a European species of soldier fly.

== Description ==
Body length: 7–9 mm. Yellow legs. Males have a green abdomen and thorax; females have a black abdomen with purple reflections.

== Biology ==
The habitat is meadowland and woodland. The adult flies from May to October. Larvae have been found in cow dung and compost.

== Distribution ==
It is found in Europe, including European Russia.
