= Ptectisargus =

Scientific classification
- Kingdom: Animalia
- Phylum: Arthropoda
- Class: Insecta
- Order: Diptera
- Family: Stratiomyidae
- Subfamily: Sarginae
- Genus: Ptectisargus; Lindner, 1968

Type species
- Ptectisargus lucidus Lindner, 1968

Genus of flies

Ptectisargus is a genus of flies in the family Stratiomyidae.

== Species ==
- Ptectisargus abditus (Lindner, 1936)
- Ptectisargus argentipellitus (Lindner, 1966)
- Ptectisargus brunneus (Lindner, 1936)
- Ptectisargus cingulatus (Lindner, 1968)
- Ptectisargus flavifrons (Lindner, 1968)
- Ptectisargus flavomarginatus (Loew, 1857)
- Ptectisargus gracilipes (Lindner, 1936)
- Ptectisargus keiseri (Lindner, 1966)
- Ptectisargus lindneri James, 1975
- Ptectisargus longestylus (Lindner, 1966)
- Ptectisargus punctus (Lindner, 1968)
- Ptectisargus unicolor (Lindner, 1968)
