= Sagaricera =

Scientific classification
- Kingdom: Animalia
- Phylum: Arthropoda
- Class: Insecta
- Order: Diptera
- Family: Stratiomyidae
- Subfamily: Sarginae
- Genus: Sagaricera; Grünberg, 1915

Type species
- Sagaricera aenescens Grünberg, 1915

Synonyms
- Sagaricea Lindner, 1965

Genus of flies

Sagaricera is a genus of flies in the family Stratiomyidae.

== Species ==
- Sagaricera aenescens Grünberg, 1915
- Sagaricera analis (Macquart, 1838)
