= Himantigera =

Scientific classification
- Kingdom: Animalia
- Phylum: Arthropoda
- Class: Insecta
- Order: Diptera
- Family: Stratiomyidae
- Subfamily: Sarginae
- Genus: Himantigera; James, 1982

Type species
- Himantigera silvestris McFadden, 1982

Genus of flies

Himantigera is a genus of flies in the family Stratiomyidae.

== Species ==
- Himantigera dichroa (Schiner, 1868)
- Himantigera flavonigra (Lindner, 1928)
- Himantigera fulvithorax (Bigot, 1879)
- Himantigera jamesi (Lindner, 1969)
- Himantigera nigrifemorata (Macquart, 1847)
- Himantigera silvestris McFadden, 1982
- Himantigera splendens (Schiner, 1868)
- Himantigera superba (Lindner, 1949)
