= Sargus albibarbus =

Scientific classification
- Kingdom: Animalia
- Phylum: Arthropoda
- Class: Insecta
- Order: Diptera
- Family: Stratiomyidae
- Subfamily: Sarginae
- Genus: Sargus
- Species: S. albibarbus

Binomial name
- Sargus albibarbus Loew, 1855

Synonyms
- Sargus ceriferus Jaennicke, 1866

Species of fly

Sargus albibarbus is a European species of soldier fly.

== Distribution ==
Sargus albibarbus can be found in France, Italy, Russia, Ukraine, and the former location of Yugoslavia.
