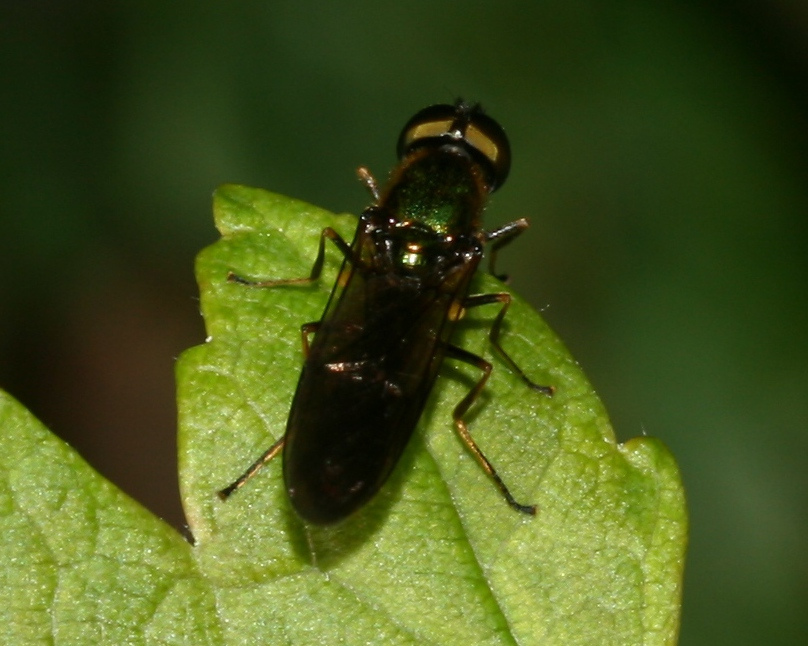

Scientific classification
- Kingdom: Animalia
- Phylum: Arthropoda
- Class: Insecta
- Order: Diptera
- Family: Stratiomyidae
- Subfamily: Sarginae
- Genus: Sargus
- Species: S. cuprarius

Binomial name
- Sargus cuprarius (Linnaeus, 1758)

Synonyms
- Musca cupraria Linnaeus, 1758; Sargus minimus Zetterstedt, 1849; Sargus nubeculosus Zetterstedt, 1842

= Sargus cuprarius =

Species of fly

Sargus cuprarius, the clouded centurion, is a European species of soldier fly.

== Description ==
Body length 6–12 mm. Green eyes with a purple transverse line, upper edge dark or violet. Face and frons with erect fine black hair; White spot at the base of each antenna. Proboscis yellowish brown. Black antennae. A shiny metallic green blue thorax, covered with fine yellow hair ( whitish in male). Wings with distinct darker spots below stigma. Black legs, yellow knees. Abdomen copper, darker than the thorax with a purple or violet end (male); violet with a copper base (female)

== Biology ==
Found in open and wooded habitats and humid places, from June. Larva in decomposing vegetable matter.

== Distribution ==
It is found in Western Europe, North and South European Russia, the Caucasus, mountains of Central Asia, Mongolia, and North America.
