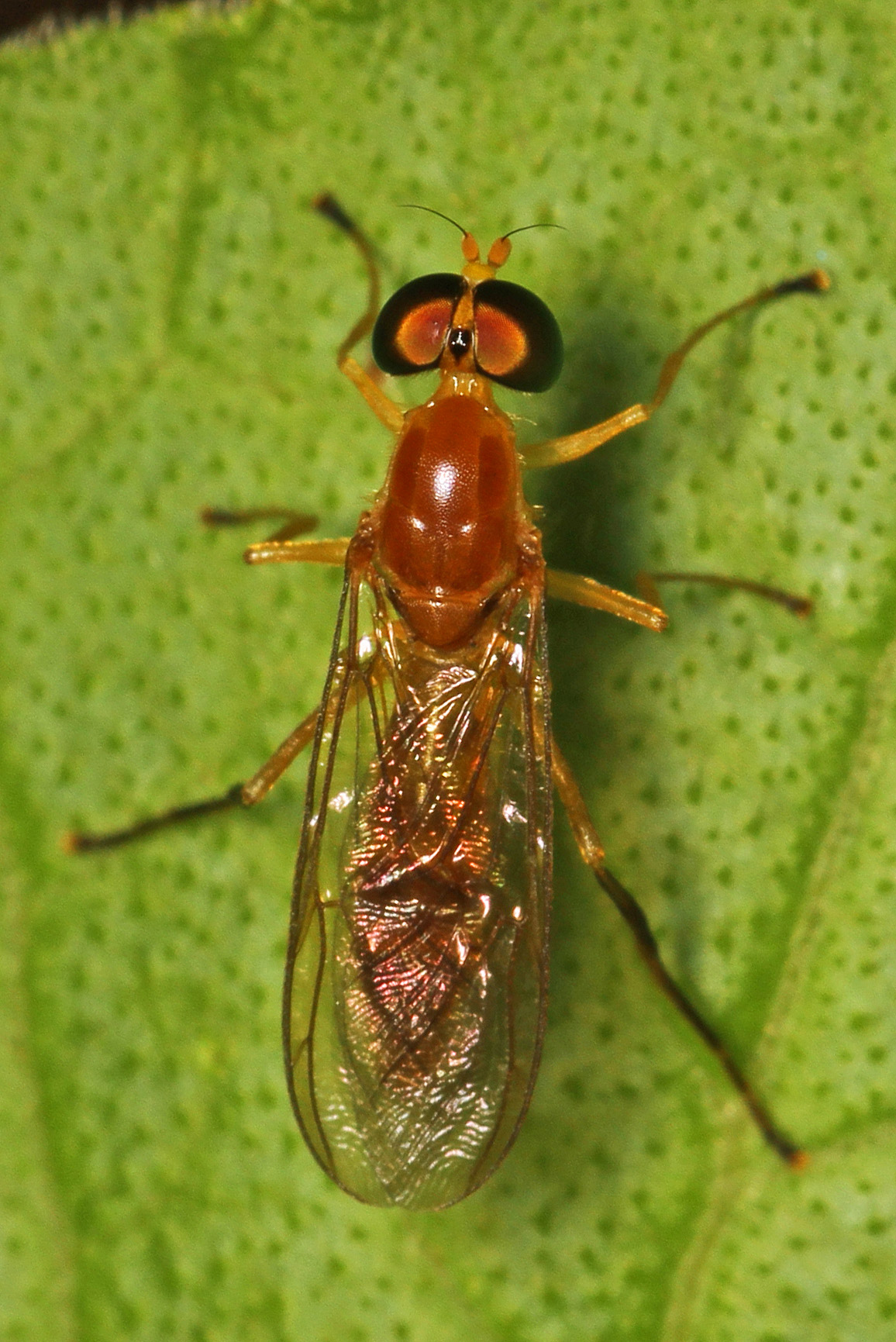
- Ptecticus trivittatus

Scientific classification
- Kingdom: Animalia
- Phylum: Arthropoda
- Clade: Pancrustacea
- Class: Insecta
- Order: Diptera
- Family: Stratiomyidae
- Subfamily: Sarginae
- Genus: Ptecticus; Loew, 1855

Type species
- Sargus testaceus Fabricius, 1805

Synonyms
- Gongrozus Enderlein, 1914; Pedicella Bigot, 1856

= Ptecticus =

Genus of flies

Ptecticus is a genus of flies in the family Stratiomyidae (soldier flies). The ground colour of the body may be yellow, brown or black, and the abdomen often shows a degree of transverse stripes. They may mimic parasitic wasps in appearance and habits. The wings are often dusky and the second abdominal segment may be translucent. A well-developed inner projection of the second antennal segment is characteristic for the majority of Ptecticus species. Their larvae are broad, flat and segmented maggots, which may be found in fermenting fruit. As of 2000, 40 species were known from the Old World alone. There are at least 150 described species in Ptecticus worldwide.

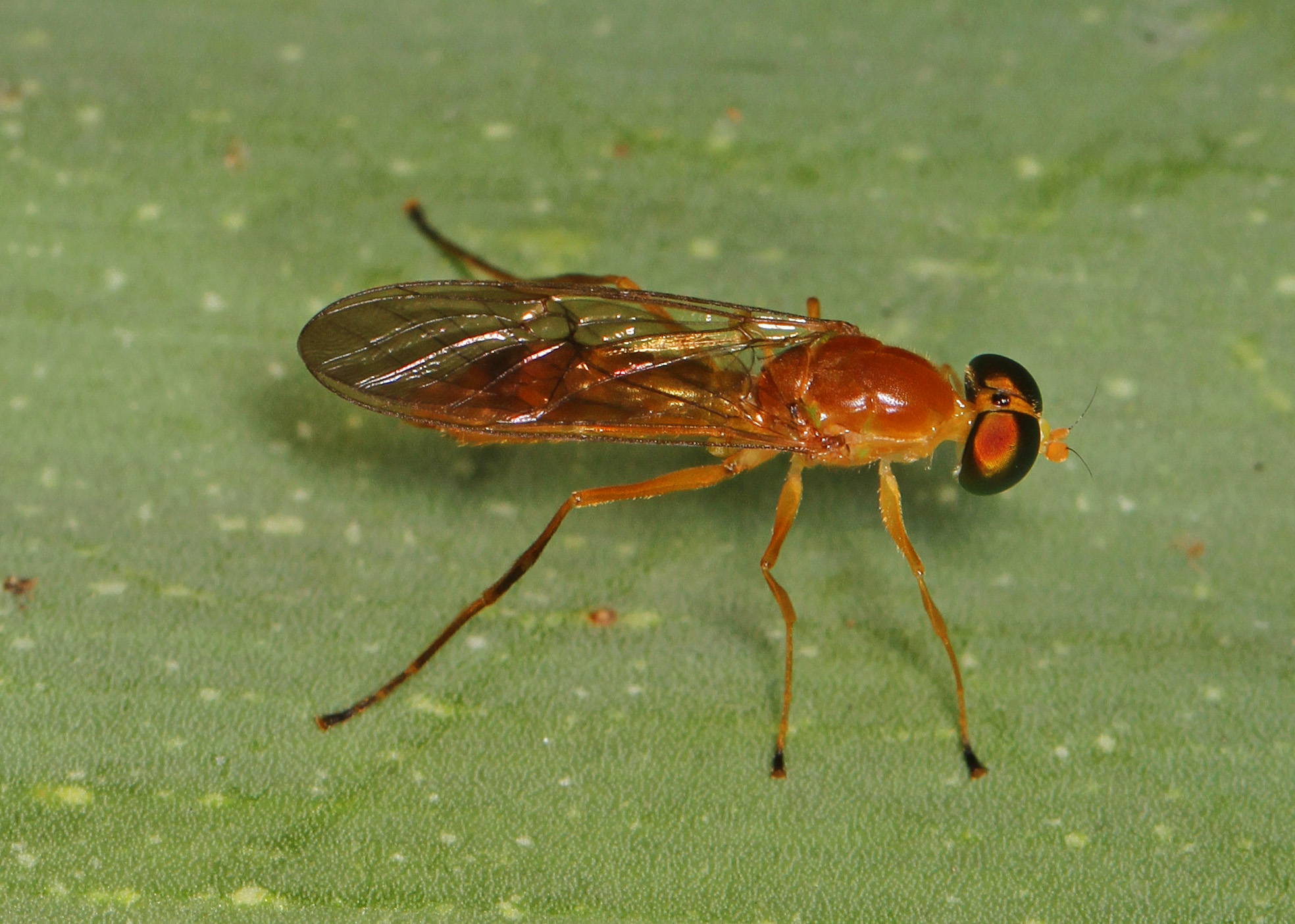
Ptecticus trivittatus

== See also ==
- List of Ptecticus species
