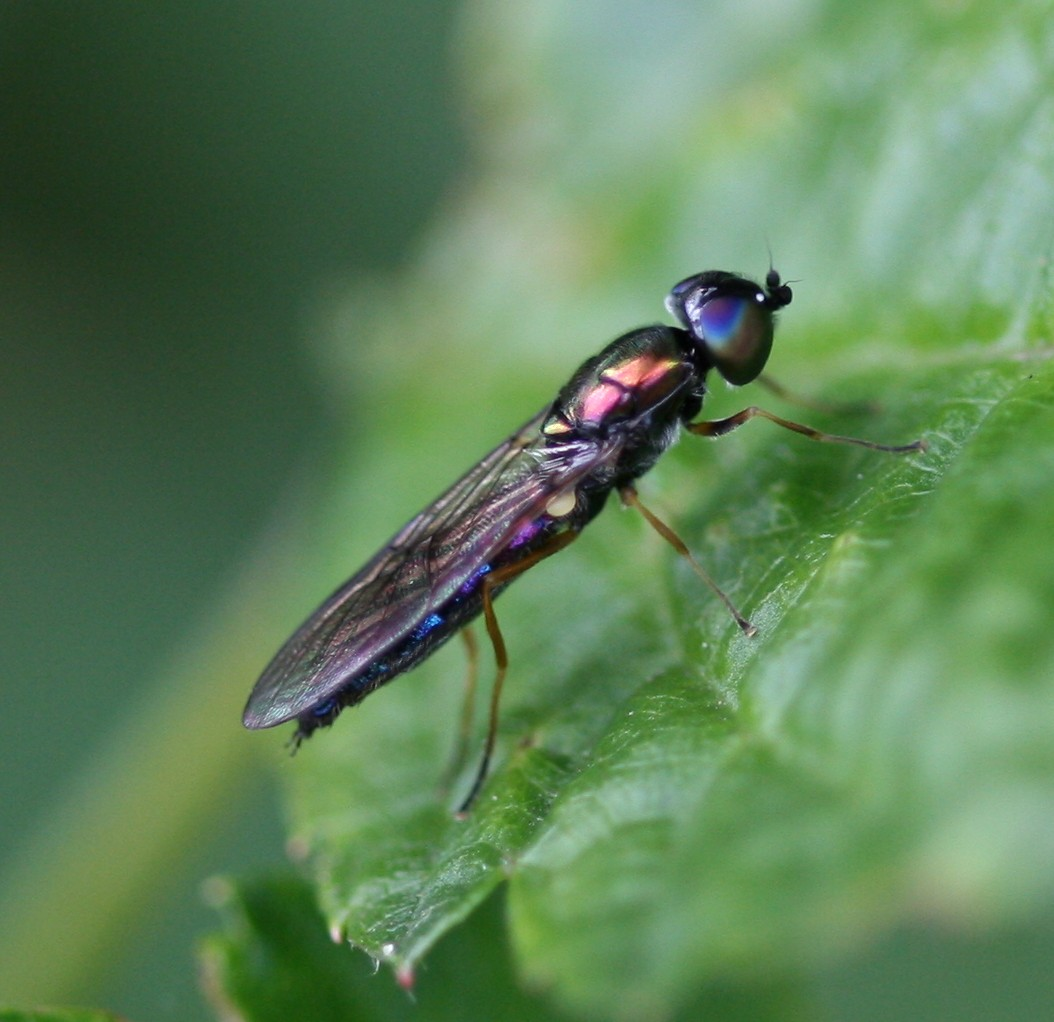
- Sargus flavipes, yellow-legged centurion

Scientific classification
- Kingdom: Animalia
- Phylum: Arthropoda
- Clade: Pancrustacea
- Class: Insecta
- Order: Diptera
- Family: Stratiomyidae
- Subfamily: Sarginae
- Genus: Sargus; Fabricius, 1798

Type species
- Musca cuprarius Linnaeus, 1758

Synonyms
- Chrysonotus Loew, 1855 (Preocc.); Chrysochroma Williston, 1896; Chrysonotomyia Hunter, 1901; Geosargus Bezzi, 1907; Surgus Ouchi, 1938 (Missp.); Pedicellina James, 1952; Himantoloba McFadden, 1970

= Sargus =

Genus of flies

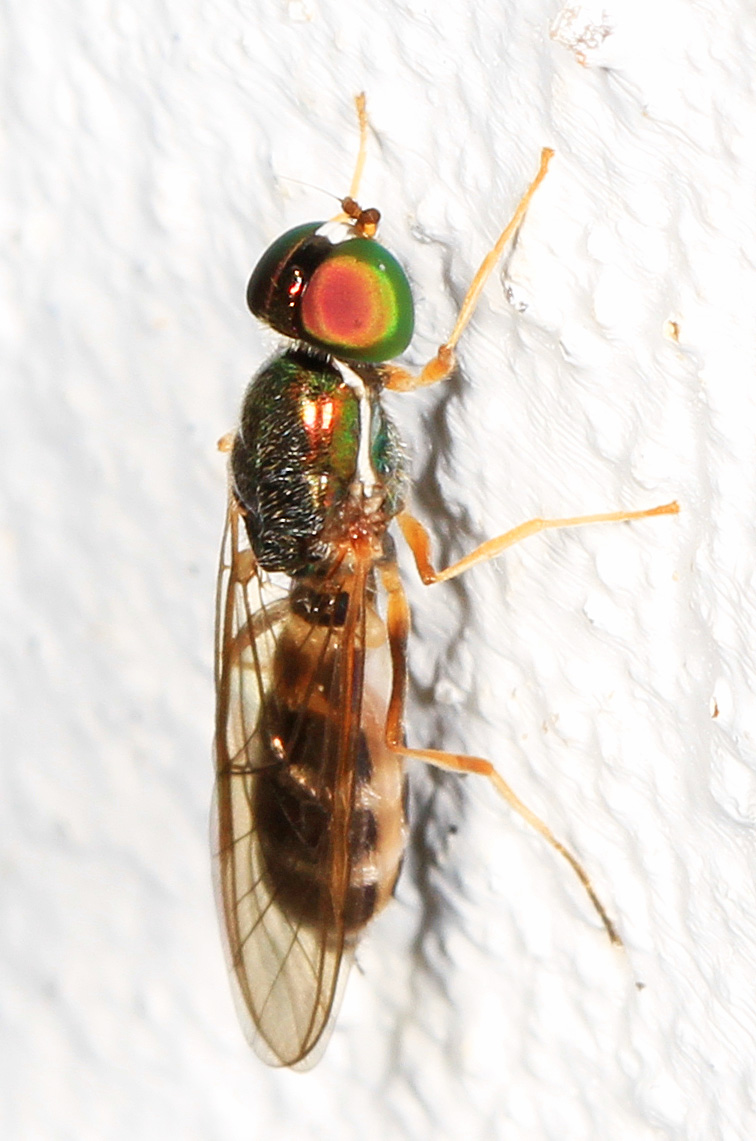
Sargus fasciatus

Sargus is a genus of soldier flies in the family Stratiomyidae.

== Selected species ==
- S. albibarbus Loew, 1855
- S. aureopilosus McFadden, 1982
- S. beppui Nagatomi, 1990
- S. bipunctatus (Scopoli, 1763)
- S. caeruleapex McFadden, 1982
- S. consisus Wulp, 1896
- S. elongatulus McFadden, 1982
- S. evansi McFadden, 1982
- S. decorus Say, 1824
- S. cuprarius (Linnaeus, 1758)
- S. cirrhosus McFadden, 1982
- S. flavipes Meigen, 1822
- S. harderseni Mason & Rozkosny, 2008
- S. iridatus (Scopoli, 1763)
- S. jaennickei Woodley, 2001
- S. maculatus (Lindner, 1936)
- S. persimilis McFadden, 1982
- S. petersoni McFadden, 1982
- S. punctatus McFadden, 1982
- S. rufipes Wahlberg, 1854
- S. transversus McFadden, 1982
- S. yerbabuena Woodley, 2001
