= Merosargus =

Scientific classification
- Kingdom: Animalia
- Phylum: Arthropoda
- Class: Insecta
- Order: Diptera
- Family: Stratiomyidae
- Subfamily: Sarginae
- Genus: Merosargus; Loew, 1855

Type species
- Sargus obscurus Wiedemann, 1830

Diversity
- at least 140 species

Synonyms
- Aloipha Enderlein, 1914; Aloiphina Lindner, 1949; Coenosargus Enderlein, 1914; Merusargus James & McFadden, 1971

Genus of flies

Merosargus is a genus of flies in the family Stratiomyidae.

== Species ==
- List of Merosargus species
