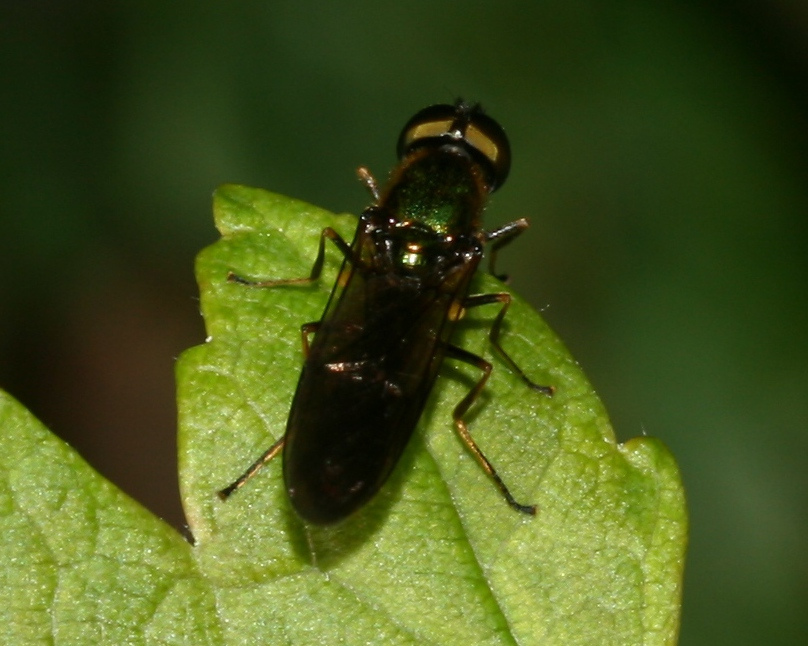
- Sargus cuprarius

Scientific classification
- Kingdom: Animalia
- Phylum: Arthropoda
- Class: Insecta
- Order: Diptera
- Family: Stratiomyidae
- Subfamily: Sarginae; Walker, 1834

= Sarginae =

Subfamily of flies

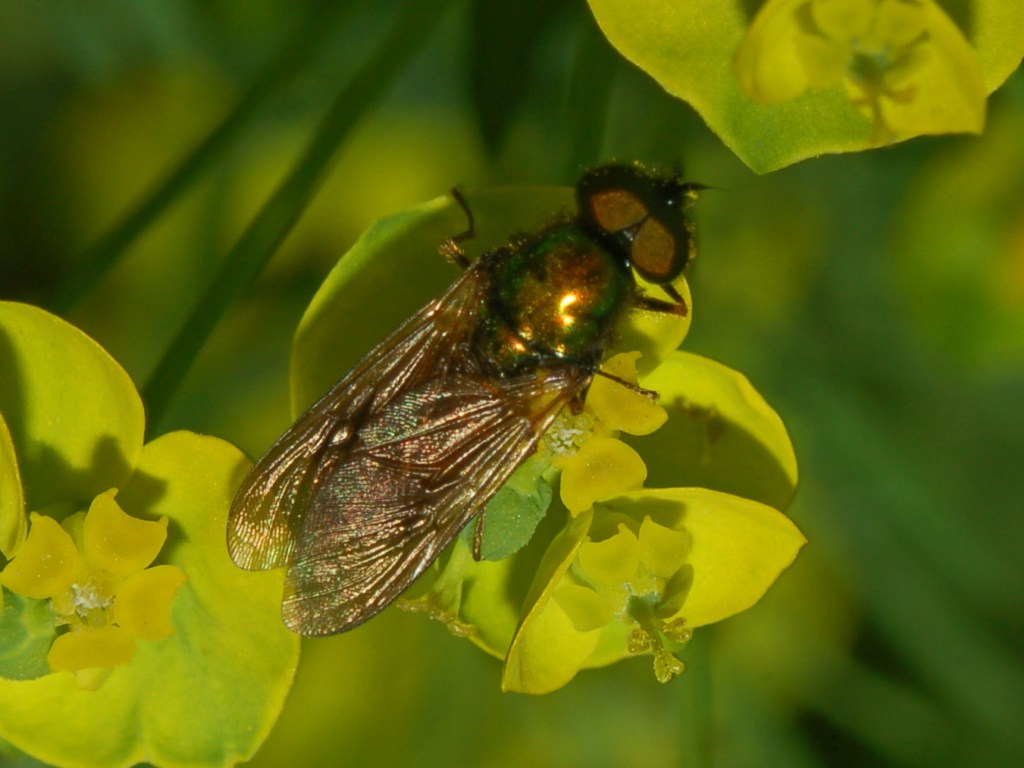
Chloromyia formosa

Sarginae is a subfamily of soldier flies in the family Stratiomyidae.

== Genera ==
- Acrochaeta Wiedemann, 1830
- Cephalochrysa Kertész, 1912
- Chloromyia Duncan, 1837
- Chrysochromioides Brunetti, 1926
- Filiptschenkia Pleske, 1926
- Formosargus James, 1939
- Gongrosargus Lindner, 1959
- Himantigera James, 1982
- Lobisquama James, 1982
- Merosargus Loew, 1855
- Microchrysa Loew, 1855
- Microptecticus Lindner, 1936
- Microsargus Lindner, 1958
- Otochrysa Lindner, 1938
- Paraptecticus Grünberg, 1915
- Ptecticus Loew, 1855
- Ptectisargus Lindner, 1968
- Sagaricera Grünberg, 1915
- Sargus Fabricius, 1798
- Stackelbergia Pleske, 1930
