= Argyrobrithes =

Scientific classification
- Kingdom: Animalia
- Phylum: Arthropoda
- Class: Insecta
- Order: Diptera
- Family: Stratiomyidae
- Subfamily: Pachygastrinae
- Genus: Argyrobrithes; Grünberg, 1915

Type species
- Argyrobrithes albopilosus Grünberg, 1915

Synonyms
- Lonchobrithes Lindner, 1968

Genus of flies

Argyrobrithes is a genus of flies in the family Stratiomyidae.

== Species ==
- Argyrobrithes albopilosus (Meijere, 1907)
- Argyrobrithes argentifer (Kertész, 1914)
- Argyrobrithes curtilamellata (Lindner, 1966)
- Argyrobrithes fuscicornis (Bezzi, 1914)
- Argyrobrithes infera (Walker, 1856)
- Argyrobrithes insularis Kertész, 1921
- Argyrobrithes separatus (Meijere, 1907)
- Argyrobrithes zernyi Lindner, 1943
