= Gabaza =

Scientific classification
- Kingdom: Animalia
- Phylum: Arthropoda
- Class: Insecta
- Order: Diptera
- Family: Stratiomyidae
- Subfamily: Pachygastrinae
- Genus: Gabaza; Walker, 1858

Type species
- Gabaza argentea Walker, 1858

Genus of flies

Gabaza is a genus of flies in the family Stratiomyidae.

== Species ==
- Gabaza albiseta (Meijere, 1907)
- Gabaza argentea Walker, 1858
- Gabaza brunettii (Krivosheina, 2002)
- Gabaza connectens (James, 1950)
- Gabaza darwini (Hill, 1919)
- Gabaza detracta (Walker, 1856)
- Gabaza dorsalis (James, 1950)
- Gabaza edashigei (Nagatomi, 1975)
- Gabaza meijerei (Krivosheina, 1983)
- Gabaza nigrotibialis (Pleske, 1930)
- Gabaza paupera (Walker, 1864)
- Gabaza sinica (Lindner, 1940)
- Gabaza tibialis (Kertész, 1909)
- Gabaza tsudai (Ôuchi, 1938)
