= Evaza =

Scientific classification
- Kingdom: Animalia
- Phylum: Arthropoda
- Class: Insecta
- Order: Diptera
- Family: Stratiomyidae
- Subfamily: Pachygastrinae
- Genus: Evaza; Walker, 1856

Type species
- Evaza bipars Walker, 1856

Synonyms
- Nerua Walker, 1858; Nerna Walker, 1859; Evasa Bigot, 1879; Pseudoevaza Kertész, 1916

Genus of flies

Evaza is a genus of flies in the family Stratiomyidae.

== Species ==
- Evaza argyroceps Bigot, 1879
- Evaza aterrima James, 1969
- Evaza atripluma James, 1969
- Evaza aurivestis James, 1969
- Evaza batchianensis Woodley, 1989
- Evaza bicolor Chen, Zhang & Yang, 2010
- Evaza bipars Walker, 1856
- Evaza brandti James, 1969
- Evaza cordata James, 1969
- Evaza dimidiata James, 1969
- Evaza discalis James, 1962
- Evaza discolor Meijere, 1916
- Evaza fenestrata James, 1969
- Evaza flava James, 1969
- Evaza flavimarginata Zhang & Yang, 2010
- Evaza flavipalpis James, 1969
- Evaza flavipes Bigot, 1879
- Evaza flaviscutellata Enderlein, 1914
- Evaza flaviscutellum Chen, Zhang & Yang, 2010
- Evaza floresina Lindner, 1937
- Evaza formosana Kertész, 1914
- Evaza fortis (Walker, 1865)
- Evaza fulviventris Bigot, 1879
- Evaza funerea James, 1969
- Evaza gracilis James, 1969
- Evaza gressitti James, 1969
- Evaza hainanensis Zhang & Yang, 2010
- Evaza hardyi James, 1969
- Evaza hyliapennis Yang, Zhang & Li, 2014
- Evaza impendens (Walker, 1859)
- Evaza incidens Curran, 1936
- Evaza indica Kertész, 1906
- Evaza inflata James, 1969
- Evaza interrupta James, 1969
- Evaza japonica Lindner, 1938
- Evaza javanensis Meijere, 1911
- Evaza kerteszi Meijere, 1914
- Evaza lanata James, 1969
- Evaza lutea James, 1969
- Evaza maculifera Meijere, 1914
- Evaza mollis (Osten Sacken, 1881)
- Evaza nigripennis Kertész, 1909
- Evaza nigrispinis Meijere, 1924
- Evaza nigritibia Chen, Zhang & Yang, 2010
- Evaza nubifera James, 1969
- Evaza pallipes Bigot, 1879
- Evaza philippinensis James, 1969
- Evaza picticornis James, 1969
- Evaza quatei James, 1969
- Evaza ravitibia Chen, Zhang & Yang, 2010
- Evaza rossi James, 1969
- Evaza scenopinoides (Walker, 1858)
- Evaza scutellaris James, 1969
- Evaza similis James, 1969
- Evaza solomensis Curran, 1936
- Evaza testacea (Hollis, 1963)
- Evaza tibialis (Walker, 1861)
- Evaza varia James, 1969
- Evaza varipes James, 1969
- Evaza ventralis James, 1969
- Evaza whitneyi Curran, 1936
- Evaza yoshimotoi James, 1969
- Evaza zhangae Zhang & Yang, 2010
