= Caenacantha =

Scientific classification
- Kingdom: Animalia
- Phylum: Arthropoda
- Class: Insecta
- Order: Diptera
- Family: Stratiomyidae
- Subfamily: Pachygastrinae
- Genus: Caenacantha; Wulp, 1885

Type species
- Caenacantha bipartita Wulp, 1885

Synonyms
- Spaniomyia Kertész, 1914

Genus of flies

Caenacantha is a genus of flies in the family Stratiomyidae.

== Species ==
- Caenacantha bipartita Wulp, 1885
- Caenacantha liburna (Walker, 1849)
- Caenacantha obesa (Walker, 1860)
- Caenacantha pulchripennis (Brauer, 1882)
- Caenacantha soror (Lindner, 1964)
