= Paracechorismenus =

Scientific classification
- Kingdom: Animalia
- Phylum: Arthropoda
- Class: Insecta
- Order: Diptera
- Family: Stratiomyidae
- Subfamily: Pachygastrinae
- Genus: Paracechorismenus; Kertész, 1916

Type species
- Paracechorismenus intermedius Kertész, 1916

Genus of flies

Paracechorismenus is a genus of flies in the family Stratiomyidae.

== Species ==
- Paracechorismenus albipes (Brunetti, 1907)
- Paracechorismenus femoratus (Meijere, 1916)
- Paracechorismenus guamae James, 1950
- Paracechorismenus infurcatus (Meijere, 1907)
- Paracechorismenus intermedius Kertész, 1916
