= Monacanthomyia =

Scientific classification
- Kingdom: Animalia
- Phylum: Arthropoda
- Class: Insecta
- Order: Diptera
- Family: Stratiomyidae
- Subfamily: Pachygastrinae
- Genus: Monacanthomyia; Brunetti, 1912

Type species
- Monacanthomyia annandalei Brunetti, 1912

Genus of flies

Monacanthomyia is a genus of flies in the family Stratiomyidae.

== Species ==
- Monacanthomyia annandalei Brunetti, 1912
- Monacanthomyia atronitens (Kertész, 1914)
- Monacanthomyia becki James, 1948
- Monacanthomyia nigrifemur (Meijere, 1914)
- Monacanthomyia robertsi James, 1980
- Monacanthomyia stigmata James, 1980
