= Dactylodeictes =

Scientific classification
- Kingdom: Animalia
- Phylum: Arthropoda
- Class: Insecta
- Order: Diptera
- Family: Stratiomyidae
- Subfamily: Pachygastrinae
- Genus: Dactylodeictes; Kertész, 1914

Type species
- Dactylodeictes amazonicus Kertész, 1914

Genus of flies

Dactylodeictes is a genus of flies in the family Stratiomyidae.

== Species ==
- Dactylodeictes amazonicus (Kertész, 1914)
- Dactylodeictes brevifacies James, 1974
- Dactylodeictes lopesi (Lindner, 1964)
- Dactylodeictes medius James, 1974
