= Drosimomyia =

Scientific classification
- Kingdom: Animalia
- Phylum: Arthropoda
- Class: Insecta
- Order: Diptera
- Family: Stratiomyidae
- Subfamily: Pachygastrinae
- Genus: Drosimomyia; Kertész, 1916

Type species
- Drosimomyia natalensis Kertész, 1916

Genus of flies

Drosimomyia is a genus of flies in the family Stratiomyidae.

== Species ==
- Drosimomyia baueri James, 1950
- Drosimomyia mercurialis Lindner, 1939
- Drosimomyia natalensis Kertész, 1916
- Drosimomyia oldroydi James, 1949
