= Aulana =

Scientific classification
- Kingdom: Animalia
- Phylum: Arthropoda
- Class: Insecta
- Order: Diptera
- Family: Stratiomyidae
- Subfamily: Pachygastrinae
- Genus: Aulana; Walker, 1864

Type species
- Aulana confirmata Walker, 1864

Synonyms
- Acraspidea Brauer, 1882; Culena Brunetti, 1920

Genus of flies

Aulana is a genus of flies in the family Stratiomyidae.

== Species ==
- Aulana confirmata Walker, 1864
- Aulana cyrtaspis Kertész, 1908
- Aulana insularis James, 1939
- Aulana sumatrana (Meijere, 1916)
