= Panacris =

Scientific classification
- Kingdom: Animalia
- Phylum: Arthropoda
- Class: Insecta
- Order: Diptera
- Family: Stratiomyidae
- Subfamily: Pachygastrinae
- Genus: Panacris; Gerstaecker, 1857

Type species
- Panacris lucida Gerstaecker, 1857

Genus of flies

Panacris is a genus of flies in the family Stratiomyidae.

== Species ==
- Panacris funebris James, 1980
- Panacris lucida Gerstaecker, 1857
- Panacris maxima Kertész, 1908
- Panacris microdonta Kertész, 1908
- Panacris nigribasis Lindner, 1949
- Panacris pictipennis Kertész, 1908
- Panacris protrudens James, 1980
- Panacris tarsalis (Gerstaecker, 1857)
