= Hermetiomima =

Scientific classification
- Kingdom: Animalia
- Phylum: Arthropoda
- Class: Insecta
- Order: Diptera
- Family: Stratiomyidae
- Subfamily: Pachygastrinae
- Genus: Hermetiomima; Grünberg, 1915

Type species
- Hermetiomima melaleuca Grünberg, 1915

Genus of flies

Hermetiomima is a genus of flies in the family Stratiomyidae.

== Species ==
- Hermetiomima melaleuca Grünberg, 1915
- Hermetiomima rufipes Lindner, 1938
