= Platynomyia =

Scientific classification
- Kingdom: Animalia
- Phylum: Arthropoda
- Class: Insecta
- Order: Diptera
- Family: Stratiomyidae
- Subfamily: Pachygastrinae
- Genus: Platynomyia; Kertész, 1916

Type species
- Platynomyia dimorpha Kertész, 1916

Genus of flies

Platynomyia is a genus of flies in the family Stratiomyidae.

== Species ==
- Platynomyia dimorpha Kertész, 1916
- Platynomyia edwardsi Lindner, 1939
