= Berkshiria albistylum =

Scientific classification
- Kingdom: Animalia
- Phylum: Arthropoda
- Class: Insecta
- Order: Diptera
- Family: Stratiomyidae
- Subfamily: Pachygastrinae
- Genus: Berkshiria
- Species: B. albistylum

Binomial name
- Berkshiria albistylum Johnson, 1914

Synonyms
- Johnsonomyia aldrichi Malloch, 1916; Pseudowallacea hungarica Kertész, 1921

Species of fly

Berkshiria albistylum is a species of soldier fly in the family Stratiomyidae. Larvae can be found under the bark of poplar trees.
