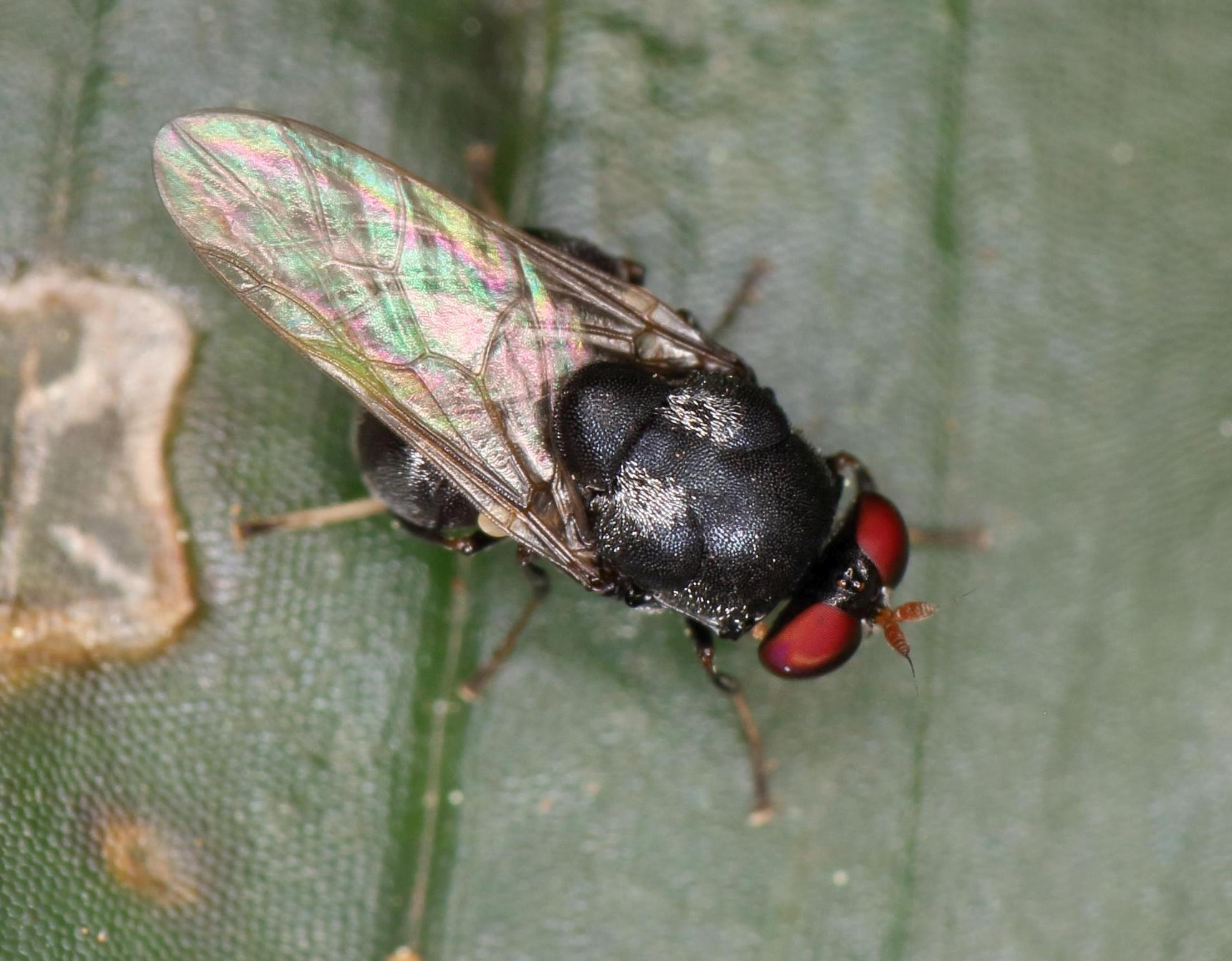
- Ageiton ater

Scientific classification
- Kingdom: Animalia
- Phylum: Arthropoda
- Class: Insecta
- Order: Diptera
- Family: Stratiomyidae
- Subfamily: Pachygastrinae
- Genus: Ageiton; Kertész, 1914

Type species
- Ageiton ater Kertész, 1914

= Ageiton =

Genus of flies

Ageiton is a monotypic genus of flies in the family Stratiomyidae. It is endemic to the Afrotropics, where it is widespread. The only species, Ageiton ater is black with short silver hairs (setae). It is similar to the three species of Cardopomyia, which are found in Madagascar.
