= Thopomyia =

Scientific classification
- Kingdom: Animalia
- Phylum: Arthropoda
- Class: Insecta
- Order: Diptera
- Family: Stratiomyidae
- Subfamily: Pachygastrinae
- Genus: Thopomyia; Kertész, 1916

Type species
- Thopomyia dichroa Kertész, 1916

Genus of flies

Thopomyia is a genus of flies in the family Stratiomyidae.

== Species ==
- Thopomyia dentata (James, 1967)
- Thopomyia dichroa Kertész, 1916
- Thopomyia jamesi (Lindner, 1967)
- Thopomyia kerteszi James, 1974
- Thopomyia pallipes (Lindner, 1951)
