= Saldubella =

Scientific classification
- Kingdom: Animalia
- Phylum: Arthropoda
- Class: Insecta
- Order: Diptera
- Family: Stratiomyidae
- Subfamily: Pachygastrinae
- Genus: Saldubella; Kertész, 1916

Type species
- Saldubella signatipennis Wulp, 1898

Genus of flies

Saldubella is a genus of flies in the family Stratiomyidae.

== Species ==
- Saldubella abdominalis James, 1977
- Saldubella albipluma James, 1977
- Saldubella brevis James, 1977
- Saldubella diffusa James, 1977
- Saldubella gressitti James, 1977
- Saldubella hardyi James, 1977
- Saldubella latimanus James, 1977
- Saldubella longipennis James, 1977
- Saldubella margaritifera Lindner, 1938
- Saldubella missimensis James, 1977
- Saldubella obliqua James, 1977
- Saldubella pictipes James, 1977
- Saldubella scutellaris James, 1977
- Saldubella signatipennis Wulp, 1898
- Saldubella tenuicornis James, 1977
- Saldubella wauensis James, 1977
- Saldubella yombae Kertész, 1916
