= Lophoteles =

Scientific classification
- Kingdom: Animalia
- Phylum: Arthropoda
- Class: Insecta
- Order: Diptera
- Family: Stratiomyidae
- Subfamily: Pachygastrinae
- Genus: Lophoteles; Loew, 1858

Type species
- Lophoteles plumula Loew, 1858

Synonyms
- Lolphoteles Williston, 1896

Genus of flies

Lophoteles is a genus of flies in the family Stratiomyidae.

== Species ==
- Lophoteles brevcispinus Rozkošný, 2013
- Lophoteles cheesmanae James, 1950
- Lophoteles costalis James, 1977
- Lophoteles dentata James, 1948
- Lophoteles elongata James, 1977
- Lophoteles fascipennis Kertész, 1914
- Lophoteles glabrifrons James, 1977
- Lophoteles laticeps James, 1977
- Lophoteles latipennis James, 1977
- Lophoteles longispinus Rozkošný, 2013
- Lophoteles plumula Loew, 1858
- Lophoteles vittata James, 1977
- Lophoteles vittipennis (Lindner, 1937)
