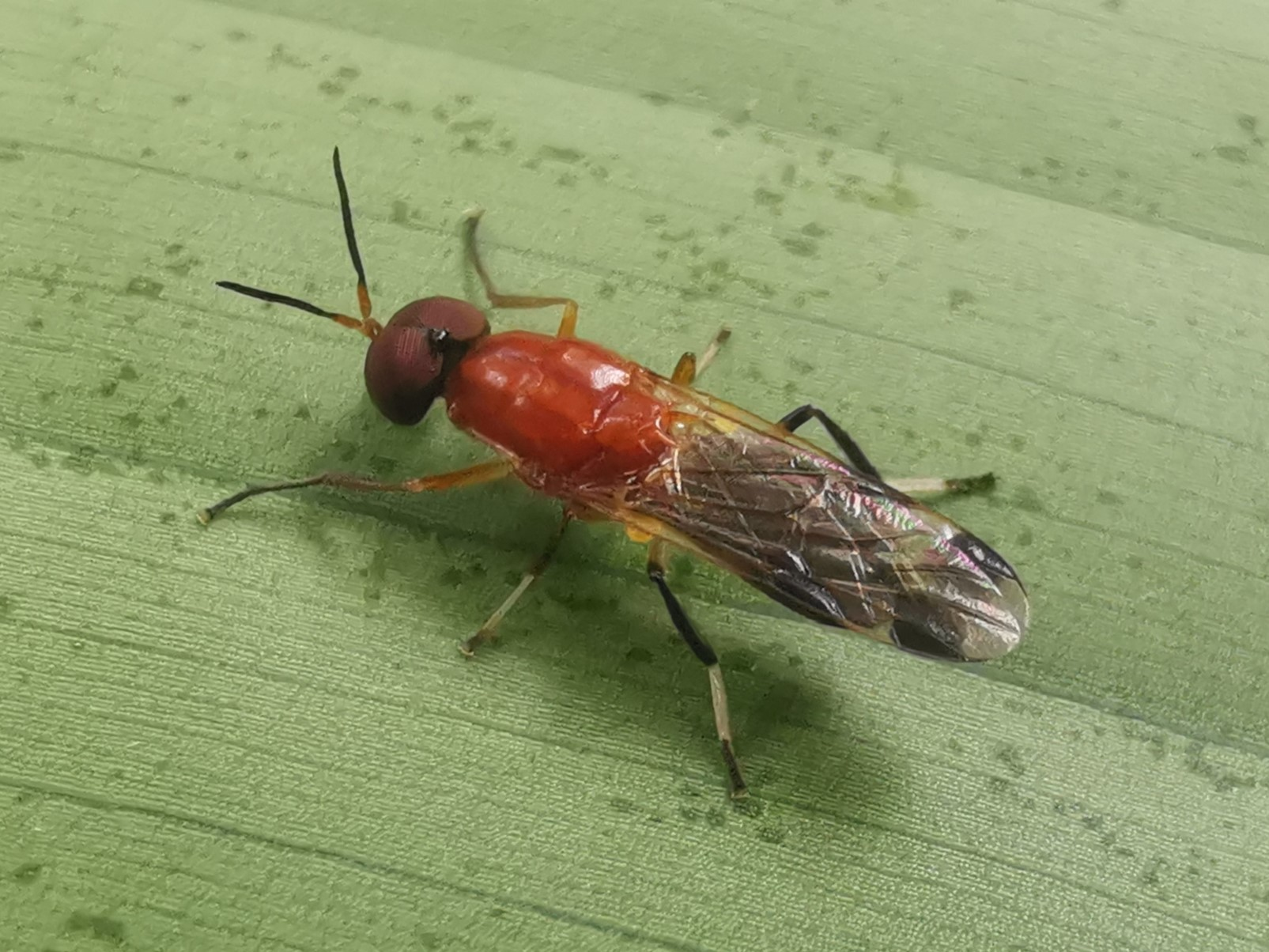
- Rosapha bimaculata

Scientific classification
- Kingdom: Animalia
- Phylum: Arthropoda
- Class: Insecta
- Order: Diptera
- Family: Stratiomyidae
- Subfamily: Pachygastrinae
- Genus: Rosapha; Walker, 1860

Type species
- Rosapha habilis Walker, 1860

Synonyms
- Calochaetis (Bigot, 1877); Calochoetis Bigot, 1877; Calcochaetis Bigot, 1879

= Rosapha =

Genus of flies

Rosapha is a genus of flies in the family Stratiomyidae.

== Species ==
- Rosapha bicolor (Bigot, 1877)
- Rosapha bimaculata Wulp, 1904
- Rosapha brevispinosa Kovac & Rozkošný, 2012
- Rosapha flagellicornis Enderlein, 1914
- Rosapha habilis Walker, 1859
- Rosapha longispina (Chen, Liang & Yang, 2010)
- Rosapha obscurata Meijere, 1916
- Rosapha umbripennis Lindner, 1957
- Rosapha variegata Meijere, 1919
- Rosapha yunnanana Chen, Liang & Yang, 2010
