= Aspidacantha =

Scientific classification
- Kingdom: Animalia
- Phylum: Arthropoda
- Class: Insecta
- Order: Diptera
- Family: Stratiomyidae
- Subfamily: Pachygastrinae
- Genus: Aspidacantha; Kertész, 1916

Type species
- Aspidacantha atra Kertész, 1916

Genus of flies

Aspidacantha is a genus of flies in the family Stratiomyidae.

== Species ==
- Aspidacantha aethiops Lindner, 1939
- Aspidacantha atra Kertész, 1916
- Aspidacantha minuta (Lindner, 1966)
