= Steleoceromys =

Scientific classification
- Kingdom: Animalia
- Phylum: Arthropoda
- Class: Insecta
- Order: Diptera
- Family: Stratiomyidae
- Subfamily: Pachygastrinae
- Genus: Steleoceromys; Grünberg, 1915

Type species
- Steleoceromys anthracina Grünberg, 1915

Synonyms
- Psapharomydops Lindner, 1966

Genus of flies

Steleoceromys is a genus of flies in the family Stratiomyidae.

== Species ==
- Steleoceromys anthracina Grünberg, 1915
- Steleoceromys procerus (Lindner, 1966)
