= Artemita (fly) =

Scientific classification
- Kingdom: Animalia
- Phylum: Arthropoda
- Class: Insecta
- Order: Diptera
- Family: Stratiomyidae
- Subfamily: Pachygastrinae
- Genus: Artemita; Walker, 1854

Type species
- Artemita amenides Walker, 1854

Synonyms
- Artemida Loew, 1860; Hypocerina Bigot, 1879

Genus of flies

Artemita is a genus of flies in the family Stratiomyidae.

== Species ==
- Artemita amenides (Walker, 1849)
- Artemita argentea Osten Sacken, 1886
- Artemita aurata (Macquart, 1846)
- Artemita banksi James, 1971
- Artemita bellardii Giglio-Tos, 1891
- Artemita bequaerti (Curran, 1925)
- Artemita brasiliana Lindner, 1964
- Artemita centor (Curran, 1934)
- Artemita convexa (Walker, 1854)
- Artemita hieroglyphica (Wiedemann, 1830)
- Artemita insularis James, 1962
- Artemita latifrons (James, 1971)
- Artemita nana (Bellardi, 1862)
- Artemita peruviana Kertész, 1914
- Artemita podexargenteus Enderlein, 1914
