= Saruga =

Saruga may refer to:

- Saruga language
- Saruga Shrine
- Saruga (fly), a genus in subfamily Pachygastrinae
