= Sternobrithes =

Scientific classification
- Kingdom: Animalia
- Phylum: Arthropoda
- Class: Insecta
- Order: Diptera
- Family: Stratiomyidae
- Subfamily: Pachygastrinae
- Genus: Sternobrithes; Loew, 1856

Type species
- Sternobrithes picticornis Bigot, 1879

Synonyms
- Stenobrithes Kertész, 1908; Sternobrites Séguy, 1953

Genus of flies

Sternobrithes is a genus of flies in the family Stratiomyidae.

== Species ==
- Sternobrithes mercurialis (Lindner, 1938)
- Sternobrithes picticornis (Bigot, 1879)
- Sternobrithes tumidus Loew, 1857
