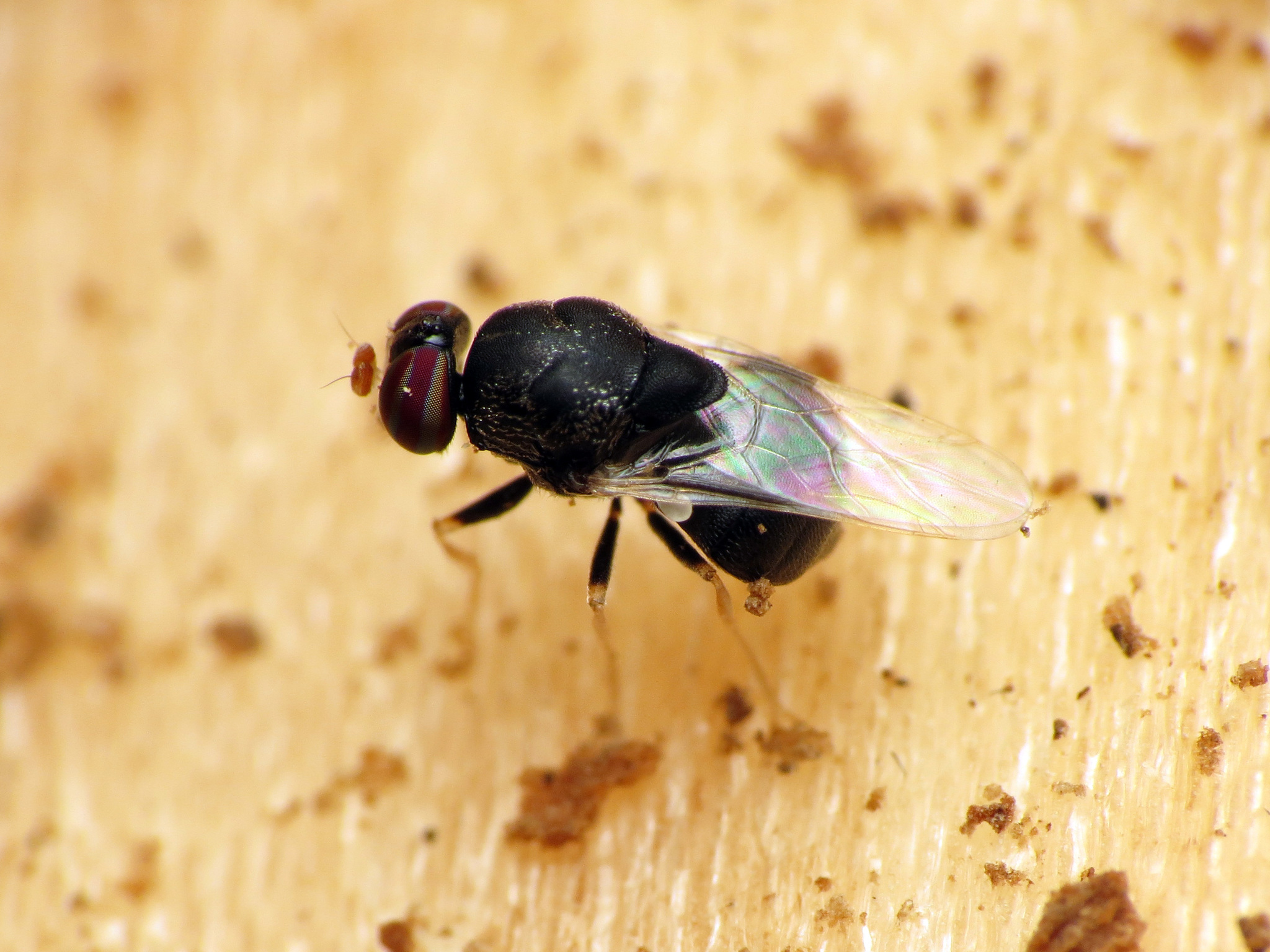
- Eidalimus fuscus

Scientific classification
- Kingdom: Animalia
- Phylum: Arthropoda
- Clade: Pancrustacea
- Class: Insecta
- Order: Diptera
- Family: Stratiomyidae
- Subfamily: Pachygastrinae
- Genus: Eidalimus; Kertész, 1914

Type species
- Eidalimus annulatus Kertész, 1914

Synonyms
- Eucynipimorpha Malloch, 1916; Pyelomyia Kertész, 1916

= Eidalimus =

Genus of flies

Eidalimus is a genus of flies in the family Stratiomyidae.

== Species ==
- Eidalimus angustifrons James, 1967
- Eidalimus annulatus Kertész, 1914
- Eidalimus flavicornis Lindner, 1969
- Eidalimus fuscus (Kraft & Cook, 1961)
- Eidalimus henshawi (Malloch, 1917)
- Eidalimus insularum James, 1980
- Eidalimus lineatus James, 1980
- Eidalimus minutus (Williston, 1901)
