= Gnesiomyia =

Scientific classification
- Kingdom: Animalia
- Phylum: Arthropoda
- Class: Insecta
- Order: Diptera
- Family: Stratiomyidae
- Subfamily: Pachygastrinae
- Genus: Gnesiomyia; Kertész, 1914

Type species
- Pachygaster crassiseta Meijere, 1911

Genus of flies

Gnesiomyia is a genus of flies in the family Stratiomyidae.

== Distribution ==
Java.

== Species ==
- Gnesiomyia crassiseta (Meijere, 1911)
