= Salduba (fly) =

Scientific classification
- Kingdom: Animalia
- Phylum: Arthropoda
- Class: Insecta
- Order: Diptera
- Family: Stratiomyidae
- Subfamily: Pachygastrinae
- Genus: Salduba; Walker, 1858

Type species
- Salduba diphysoides Walker, 1858

Synonyms
- Archisolva Enderlein, 1921; Enoplomyia Bigot, 1879; Enoplomyia Brauer, 1882; Euoplomyia Scudder, 1882; Euplomyia Bigot, 1878

Genus of flies

Salduba is a genus of flies in the family Stratiomyidae.

== Species ==
- Salduba areolaris Walker, 1864
- Salduba austeni Kertész, 1908
- Salduba australis James, 1950
- Salduba carinifrons (Enderlein, 1921)
- Salduba confusa Kertész, 1908
- Salduba cothurnata (Bigot, 1878)
- Salduba diphysoides Walker, 1858
- Salduba elegans Kertész, 1908
- Salduba gradiens Walker, 1864
- Salduba inermis Kertész, 1908
- Salduba lugubris Walker, 1861
- Salduba maxima Kertész, 1908
