= Lenomyia =

Scientific classification
- Kingdom: Animalia
- Phylum: Arthropoda
- Class: Insecta
- Order: Diptera
- Family: Stratiomyidae
- Subfamily: Pachygastrinae
- Genus: Lenomyia; Kertész, 1916

Type species
- Lenomyia honesta Kertész, 1916

Genus of flies

Lenomyia is a genus of flies in the family Stratiomyidae.

== Species ==
- Lenomyia alticola James, 1977
- Lenomyia glabra James, 1977
- Lenomyia grandis James, 1977
- Lenomyia honesta Kertész, 1916
- Lenomyia lucens James, 1977
- Lenomyia pallipes James, 1977
- Lenomyia pyrifera James, 1977
- Lenomyia sedlacekorum James, 1977
- Lenomyia similis James, 1977
