= Tindacera =

Scientific classification
- Kingdom: Animalia
- Phylum: Arthropoda
- Class: Insecta
- Order: Diptera
- Family: Stratiomyidae
- Subfamily: Pachygastrinae
- Genus: Tindacera; Lindner, 1961

Type species
- Tindacera quadrispinosa Lindner, 1961

Genus of flies

Tindacera is a genus of flies in the family Stratiomyidae.

== Species ==
- Tindacera quadrispinosa Lindner, 1961
