= Marangua =

Scientific classification
- Kingdom: Animalia
- Phylum: Arthropoda
- Class: Insecta
- Order: Diptera
- Family: Stratiomyidae
- Subfamily: Pachygastrinae
- Genus: Marangua; Lindner, 1960

Type species
- Marangua pygmaea Lindner, 1960

Genus of flies

Marangua is a genus of flies in the family Stratiomyidae.

== Distribution ==
Tanzania.

== Species ==
- Marangua pygmaea Lindner, 1960
