= Eicochalcidina =

Scientific classification
- Kingdom: Animalia
- Phylum: Arthropoda
- Class: Insecta
- Order: Diptera
- Family: Stratiomyidae
- Subfamily: Pachygastrinae
- Genus: Eicochalcidina; Lindner, 1964

Type species
- Eicochalcidina marginalis Lindner, 1964

Genus of flies

Eicochalcidina is a genus of flies in the family Stratiomyidae.

== Species ==
- Eicochalcidina golbachi James, 1967
- Eicochalcidina marginalis Lindner, 1964
