= Ptilocera =

Scientific classification
- Kingdom: Animalia
- Phylum: Arthropoda
- Class: Insecta
- Order: Diptera
- Family: Stratiomyidae
- Subfamily: Pachygastrinae
- Genus: Ptilocera; Wiedemann, 1820

Type species
- Ptilocera quadridentata Fabricius, 1805

Synonyms
- Ptilocerina Schiner, 1868; Ptilodactylus Latreille, 1829; Philocera Enderlein, 1914

Genus of flies

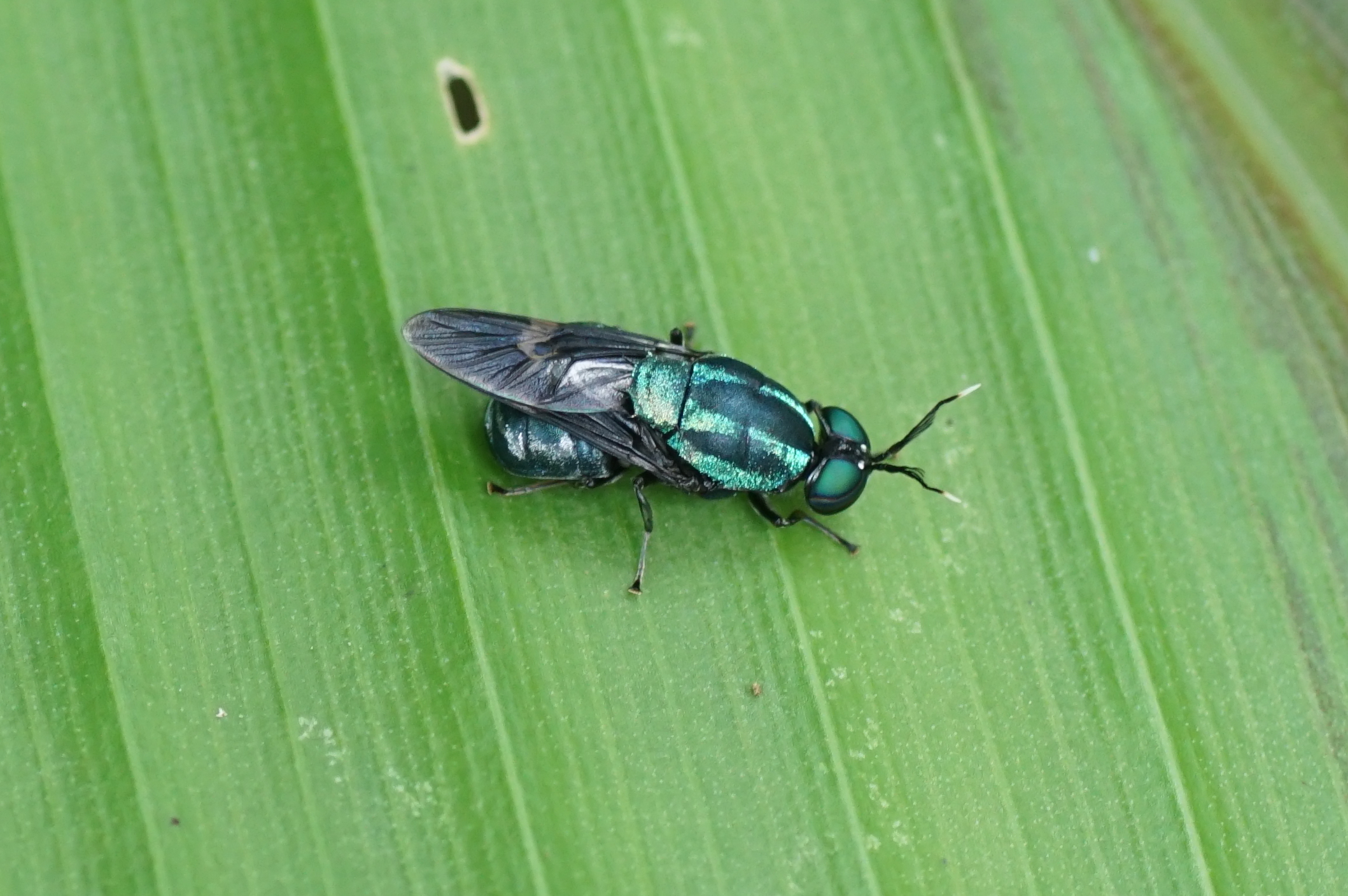
Stratiomyidae Ptilocera sp. - possibly Ptilocera continua

Ptilocera is a genus of flies in the family Stratiomyidae.

== Species ==
- Ptilocera amethystina Snellen van Vollenhoven, 1857
- Ptilocera aureopilosa Mason & Rozkošný, 2011
- Ptilocera bergi James, 1948
- Ptilocera continua Walker, 1851
- Ptilocera fastuosa Gerstaecker, 1857
- Ptilocera flavispina Yang, Zhang & Li, 2014
- Ptilocera kerteszi Mason & Rozkošný, 2011
- Ptilocera lateralis Macquart, 1846
- Ptilocera latiscutella Yang, Zhang & Li, 2014
- Ptilocera paradisea Lindner, 1951
- Ptilocera quadridentata (Fabricius, 1805)
- Ptilocera simplex Mason & Rozkošný, 2011
- Ptilocera smaragdifera Walker, 1859
- Ptilocera smaragdina Walker, 1849
- Ptilocera violacea Edwards, 1915
