= Adraga (fly) =

Scientific classification
- Kingdom: Animalia
- Phylum: Arthropoda
- Class: Insecta
- Order: Diptera
- Family: Stratiomyidae
- Subfamily: Pachygastrinae
- Genus: Adraga; Walker, 1858

Type species
- Adraga univitta Walker, 1858

Genus of flies

Adraga is a genus of flies in the family Stratiomyidae.

== Species ==
- Adraga australis James, 1948
- Adraga crassivena Kertész, 1916
- Adraga dimidiata James, 1977
- Adraga semiglabra James, 1980
- Adraga tomentosa James, 1980
- Adraga univitta Walker, 1858
- Adraga varipes James, 1980
