= Strophognathus =

Scientific classification
- Kingdom: Animalia
- Phylum: Arthropoda
- Class: Insecta
- Order: Diptera
- Family: Stratiomyidae
- Subfamily: Pachygastrinae
- Genus: Strophognathus; Lindner, 1955

Type species
- Strophognathus argentatus Lindner, 1955

Synonyms
- Strophognatus Edwards & Hopwood, 1966; Strophognatus Lindner, 1955

Genus of flies

Strophognathus is a genus of flies in the family Stratiomyidae.

== Species ==
- Strophognathus argentatus Lindner, 1955
