= Diplopeltina =

Scientific classification
- Kingdom: Animalia
- Phylum: Arthropoda
- Class: Insecta
- Order: Diptera
- Family: Stratiomyidae
- Subfamily: Pachygastrinae
- Genus: Diplopeltina; Lindner, 1972
- Species: D. skaifei

Binomial name
- Diplopeltina skaifei Lindner, 1972

Genus of flies

Diplopeltina is a genus of flies in the family Stratiomyidae. It is monotypic, being represented by the single species Diplopeltina skaifei.

== Distribution ==
South Africa.
