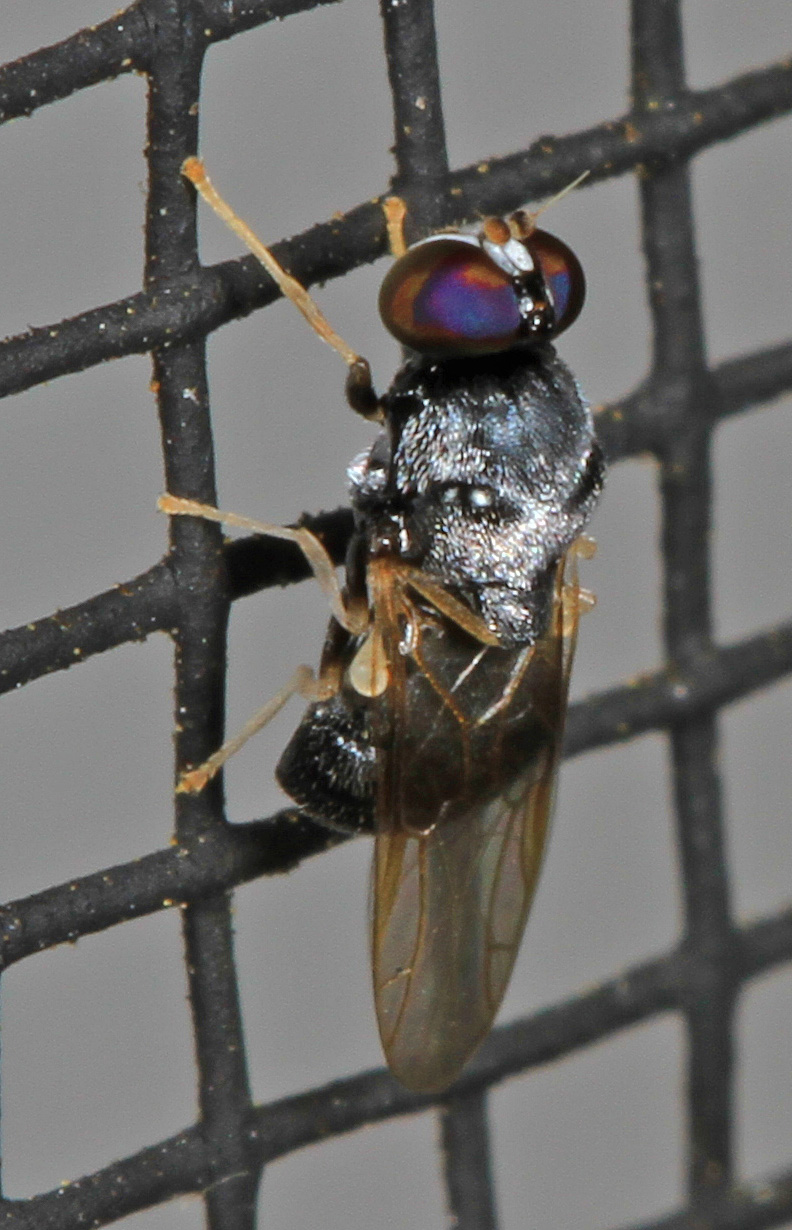

Scientific classification
- Kingdom: Animalia
- Phylum: Arthropoda
- Class: Insecta
- Order: Diptera
- Family: Stratiomyidae
- Subfamily: Pachygastrinae
- Genus: Gowdeyana
- Species: G. punctifera

Binomial name
- Gowdeyana punctifera (Malloch, 1915)

Synonyms
- Eupachygaster punctifer Malloch, 1915

= Gowdeyana punctifera =

Species of fly

Gowdeyana punctifera is a species of soldier fly in the family Stratiomyidae. The range of this species includes the Canadian provinces of British Columbia, Saskatchewan, Ontario, and Quebec.

== Distribution ==
United States, Canada, Mexico.
