= Diplephippium =

Scientific classification
- Kingdom: Animalia
- Phylum: Arthropoda
- Class: Insecta
- Order: Diptera
- Family: Stratiomyidae
- Subfamily: Pachygastrinae
- Genus: Diplephippium; Speiser, 1908

Type species
- Diplephippium amphicentrium Speiser, 1908

Genus of flies

Diplephippium is a genus of flies in the family Stratiomyidae.

== Species ==
- Diplephippium amphicentrium Speiser, 1908
- Diplephippium snyderi James, 1949
- Diplephippium tessmanni Grünberg, 1915
