= Vittiger =

Scientific classification
- Kingdom: Animalia
- Phylum: Arthropoda
- Class: Insecta
- Order: Diptera
- Family: Stratiomyidae
- Subfamily: Pachygastrinae
- Genus: Vittiger; Kertész, 1909

Type species
- Vittiger schnusei Kertész, 1909

Genus of flies

Vittiger is a genus of flies in the family Stratiomyidae.

== Species ==
- Vittiger schnusei Kertész, 1909
