= Meristomeringina =

Scientific classification
- Kingdom: Animalia
- Phylum: Arthropoda
- Class: Insecta
- Order: Diptera
- Family: Stratiomyidae
- Subfamily: Pachygastrinae
- Genus: Meristomeringina; James, 1952

Type species
- Meristomeringina mimetes James, 1952

Genus of flies

Meristomeringina is a genus of flies in the family Stratiomyidae.

== Species ==
- Meristomeringina aka Woodley, 1987
- Meristomeringina cholo Woodley, 1987
- Meristomeringina combinata (Lindner, 1958)
- Meristomeringina kontagora Woodley, 1987
- Meristomeringina mimetes James, 1952
- Meristomeringina praestigiator Woodley, 1987
