= Berkshiria =

Scientific classification
- Kingdom: Animalia
- Phylum: Arthropoda
- Class: Insecta
- Order: Diptera
- Family: Stratiomyidae
- Subfamily: Pachygastrinae
- Genus: Berkshiria; Johnson, 1914

Type species
- Berkshiria albistylum Johnson, 1914

Synonyms
- Johnsonomyia Malloch, 1916; Pseudowallacea Kertész, 1921; Strobiloceromyia Pleske, 1922; Psedowallacea Ôuchi, 1940; Psedowallacae Ôuchi, 1940; Jonnsonomyia Krivosheina, 1973

Genus of flies

Berkshiria is a genus of flies in the family Stratiomyidae.

== Species ==
- Berkshiria albistylum Johnson, 1914
- Berkshiria hungarica (Kertesz, 1921)
