= Biastes =

Biastes may refer to:

- Biastes (bee), a genus of bees in the family Apidae
- Biastes, a former genus of birds in the family Thamnophilidae, now a synonym of Biatas
- Biastes, a former genus of flies in the family Stratomyidae, now a synonym of Tinda
