= Lampetiopus =

Scientific classification
- Kingdom: Animalia
- Phylum: Arthropoda
- Class: Insecta
- Order: Diptera
- Family: Stratiomyidae
- Subfamily: Pachygastrinae
- Genus: Lampetiopus; Lindner, 1936

Type species
- Lampetiopus umbrosus Lindner, 1936

Genus of flies

Lampetiopus is a genus of flies in the family Stratiomyidae.

== Distribution ==
Madagascar.

== Species ==
- Lampetiopus umbrosus Lindner, 1936
