= Sathroptera =

Scientific classification
- Kingdom: Animalia
- Phylum: Arthropoda
- Class: Insecta
- Order: Diptera
- Family: Stratiomyidae
- Subfamily: Pachygastrinae
- Genus: Sathroptera; Kertész, 1914

Type species
- Sathroptera flavipes Kertész, 1914

Genus of flies

Sathroptera is a genus of flies in the family Stratiomyidae.

== Species ==
- Sathroptera flavipes Kertész, 1914
