= Neoacanthina =

Scientific classification
- Kingdom: Animalia
- Phylum: Arthropoda
- Class: Insecta
- Order: Diptera
- Family: Stratiomyidae
- Subfamily: Pachygastrinae
- Genus: Neoacanthina; Kertész, 1914

Type species
- Neoacanthina fasciata Kertész, 1914

Genus of flies

Neoacanthina is a genus of flies in the family Stratiomyidae.

== Distribution ==
Brazil.

== Species ==
- Neoacanthina fasciata Kertész, 1914
