= Lyprotemyia =

Scientific classification
- Kingdom: Animalia
- Phylum: Arthropoda
- Class: Insecta
- Order: Diptera
- Family: Stratiomyidae
- Subfamily: Pachygastrinae
- Genus: Lyprotemyia; Kertész, 1909

Type species
- Lyprotemyia formicaeformis Kertész, 1909

Synonyms
- Lypretemyia Kertész, 1916

Genus of flies

Lyprotemyia is a genus of flies in the family Stratiomyidae.

== Species ==
- Lyprotemyia flavipes James, 1980
- Lyprotemyia formicaeformis Kertész, 1909
- Lyprotemyia mimetica James, 1980
- Lyprotemyia mutica James, 1980
- Lyprotemyia villosa (James, 1939)
