= Manotes =

Manotes may refer to:

- Manotes (fly), a genus of flies in the family Stratiomyidae
- Manotes (plant), a genus of plants in the family Connaraceae
