= Meristomerinx =

Scientific classification
- Kingdom: Animalia
- Phylum: Arthropoda
- Clade: Pancrustacea
- Class: Insecta
- Order: Diptera
- Family: Stratiomyidae
- Subfamily: Pachygastrinae
- Genus: Meristomerinx; Enderlein, 1914

Type species
- Meristomerinx camerunensis Enderlein, 1914

Genus of flies

Meristomerinx is a genus of flies in the family Stratiomyidae.

== Species ==
- Meristomerinx camerunensis Enderlein, 1914
- Meristomerinx tabaniformis (Lindner, 1952)
