= Camptopteromyia =

Scientific classification
- Kingdom: Animalia
- Phylum: Arthropoda
- Class: Insecta
- Order: Diptera
- Family: Stratiomyidae
- Subfamily: Pachygastrinae
- Genus: Camptopteromyia; Meijere, 1914

Type species
- Camptopteromyia fractipennis Meijere, 1914

Genus of flies

Camptopteromyia is a genus of flies in the family Stratiomyidae.

== Species ==
- Camptopteromyia flaviantenna Yang, Zhang & Li, 2014
- Camptopteromyia flavipes James, 1962
- Camptopteromyia flavitarsa Yang, Zhang & Li, 2014
- Camptopteromyia fractipennis Meijere, 1914
- Camptopteromyia lanata James, 1962
- Camptopteromyia nigriflagella Yang, Zhang & Li, 2014
- Camptopteromyia obscura James, 1962
- Camptopteromyia tibialis James, 1962
