= Dactylotinda =

Scientific classification
- Kingdom: Animalia
- Phylum: Arthropoda
- Class: Insecta
- Order: Diptera
- Family: Stratiomyidae
- Subfamily: Pachygastrinae
- Genus: Dactylotinda; Lindner, 1965

Type species
- Dactylotinda saegeri Lindner, 1965

Genus of flies

Dactylotinda is a genus of flies in the family Stratiomyidae.

== Distribution ==
Congo.

== Species ==
- Dactylotinda saegeri Lindner, 1965
