= Hypoceromys =

Scientific classification
- Kingdom: Animalia
- Phylum: Arthropoda
- Class: Insecta
- Order: Diptera
- Family: Stratiomyidae
- Subfamily: Pachygastrinae
- Genus: Hypoceromys; Lindner, 1935

Type species
- Hypoceromys albisetosa Lindner, 1935

Synonyms
- Hypoceromya Lindner, 1970; Hypoxycera Lindner, 1966; Meristomeringella Lindner, 1966

Genus of flies

Hypoceromys is a genus of flies in the family Stratiomyidae.

== Species ==
- Hypoceromys albisetosa Lindner, 1935
- Hypoceromys australis Lindner, 1958
- Hypoceromys jamesi (Lindner, 1965)
- Hypoceromys nigripes (Lindner, 1938)
- Hypoceromys similis Lindner, 1952
