= Ashantina =

Scientific classification
- Kingdom: Animalia
- Phylum: Arthropoda
- Class: Insecta
- Order: Diptera
- Family: Stratiomyidae
- Subfamily: Pachygastrinae
- Genus: Ashantina; Kertész, 1914

Type species
- Ashantina antennata Kertész, 1914

Synonyms
- Neosolva Séguy, 1953

Genus of flies

Ashantina is a genus of flies in the family Stratiomyidae.

== Species ==
- Ashantina antennata Kertész, 1914
- Ashantina dubia (Séguy, 1953)
