= Cibotogaster =

Scientific classification
- Kingdom: Animalia
- Phylum: Arthropoda
- Class: Insecta
- Order: Diptera
- Family: Stratiomyidae
- Subfamily: Pachygastrinae
- Genus: Cibotogaster; Enderlein, 1914

Type species
- Cibotogaster azurea Gerstaecker, 1857

Synonyms
- Tetracanthina Enderlein, 1914

Genus of flies

Cibotogaster is a genus of flies in the family Stratiomyidae.

== Species ==
- Cibotogaster argentihirta Brunetti, 1923
- Cibotogaster auricollis (Brunetti, 1907)
- Cibotogaster azurea (Gerstaecker, 1857)
- Cibotogaster enderleini Kertész, 1914
- Cibotogaster fumipennis Kertész, 1914
- Cibotogaster kerteszii Krivosheina, 1992
- Cibotogaster varia (Walker, 1854)
- Cibotogaster walkeri James, 1975
