= Dactylacantha =

Scientific classification
- Kingdom: Animalia
- Phylum: Arthropoda
- Class: Insecta
- Order: Diptera
- Family: Stratiomyidae
- Subfamily: Pachygastrinae
- Genus: Dactylacantha; Lindner, 1964
- Species: D. plaumanni

Binomial name
- Dactylacantha plaumanni Lindner, 1964

Genus of flies

Dactylacantha is a genus of flies in the family Stratiomyidae. The genus is monotypic, its only species being Dactylacantha plaumanni.

== Distribution ==
Brazil.
