= Cosmariomyia pallidipennis =

Scientific classification
- Kingdom: Animalia
- Phylum: Arthropoda
- Class: Insecta
- Order: Diptera
- Family: Stratiomyidae
- Subfamily: Pachygastrinae
- Genus: Cosmariomyia
- Species: C. pallidipennis

Binomial name
- Cosmariomyia pallidipennis (Williston, 1901)

Synonyms
- Lophoteles pallidipennis Williston, 1901

Species of fly

Cosmariomyia pallidipennis is a species of soldier fly in the family Stratiomyidae.

== Distribution ==
Canada, United States, Mexico
