= Anargemus =

Scientific classification
- Kingdom: Animalia
- Phylum: Arthropoda
- Class: Insecta
- Order: Diptera
- Family: Stratiomyidae
- Subfamily: Pachygastrinae
- Genus: Anargemus; Lindner, 1965

Type species
- Anargemus basalis Lindner, 1965

Genus of flies

Anargemus is a genus of flies in the family Stratiomyidae.

== Species ==
- Anargemus basalis Lindner, 1965
