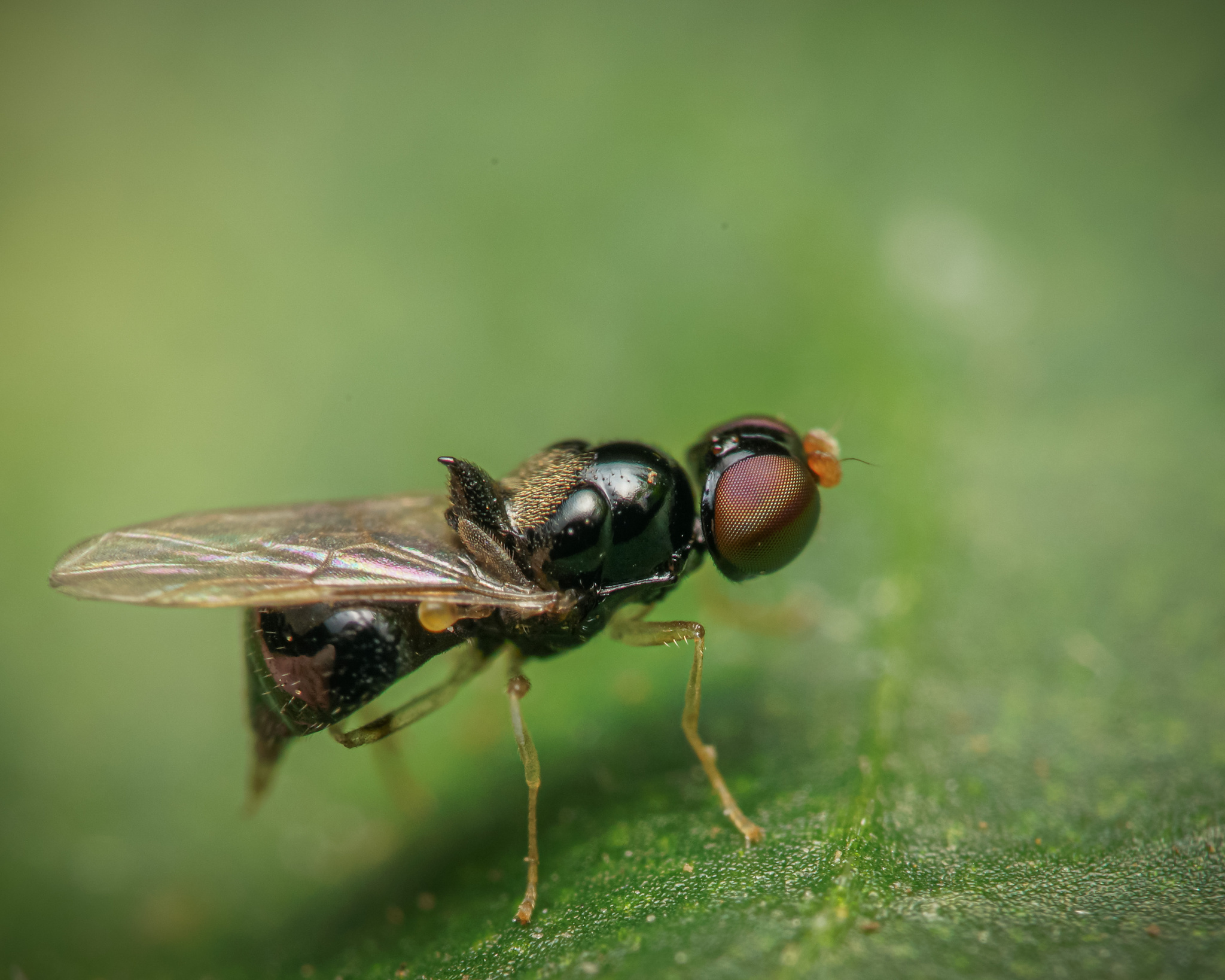

Scientific classification
- Kingdom: Animalia
- Phylum: Arthropoda
- Clade: Pancrustacea
- Class: Insecta
- Order: Diptera
- Family: Stratiomyidae
- Subfamily: Pachygastrinae
- Genus: Ankylacantha; Lindner, 1955
- Species: A. keiseri

Binomial name
- Ankylacantha keiseri Lindner, 1955

= Ankylacantha =

Ankylacantha keiseri

Genus of flies

Ankylacantha is a genus of flies in the family Stratiomyidae. It is currently considered as monotypic, being represented by the single species Ankylacantha keiseri.
