= Meristocera =

Scientific classification
- Kingdom: Animalia
- Phylum: Arthropoda
- Class: Insecta
- Order: Diptera
- Family: Stratiomyidae
- Subfamily: Pachygastrinae
- Genus: Meristocera; Lindner, 1964

Type species
- Meristocera aurea Lindner, 1964

Genus of flies

Meristocera is a genus of flies in the family Stratiomyidae.

== Species ==
- Meristocera aurea Lindner, 1964
- Meristocera laticornis James, 1967
