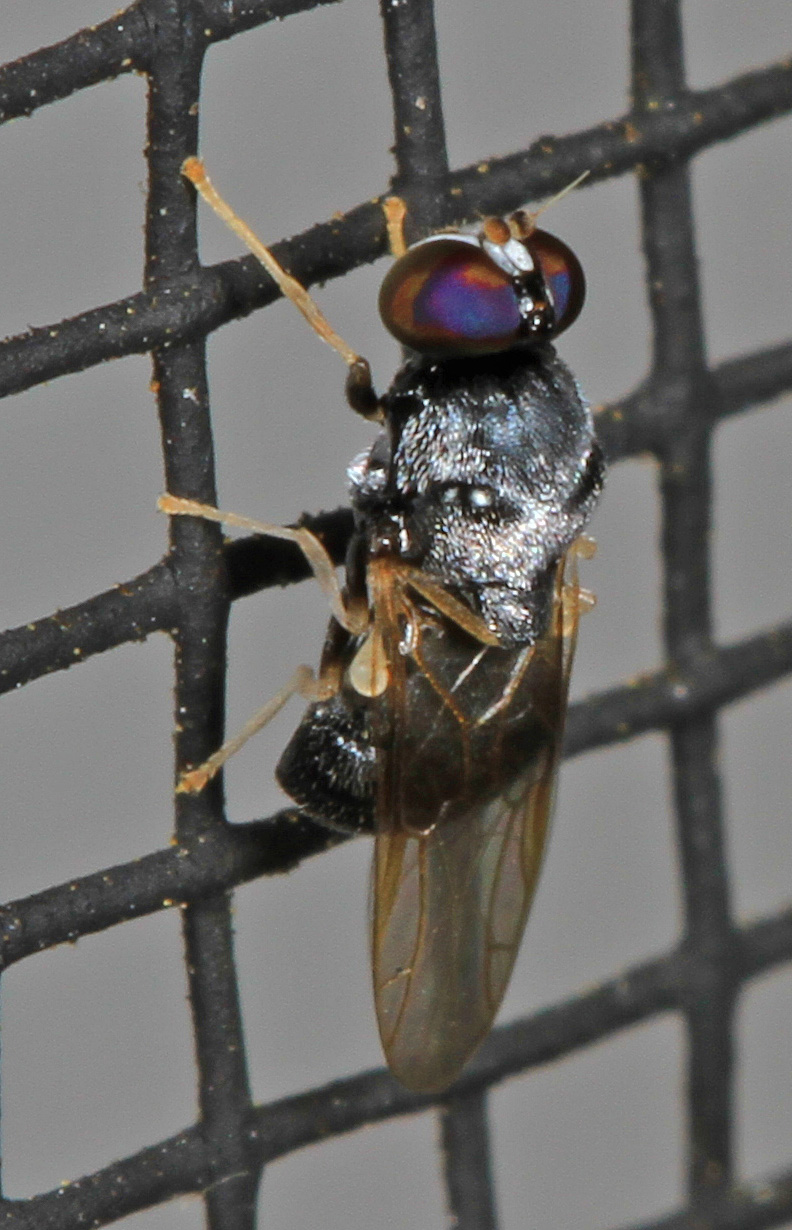
- Gowdeyana punctifera

Scientific classification
- Kingdom: Animalia
- Phylum: Arthropoda
- Class: Insecta
- Order: Diptera
- Family: Stratiomyidae
- Subfamily: Pachygastrinae
- Genus: Gowdeyana; Curran, 1928

Type species
- Gowdeyana mirabilis Curran, 1928

Synonyms
- Pareidalimus Lindner, 1935

= Gowdeyana =

Genus of flies

Gowdeyana is a genus of flies in the family Stratiomyidae.

== Species ==
- Gowdeyana albipilosa James, 1980
- Gowdeyana argentea (James, 1967)
- Gowdeyana mirabilis Curran, 1928
- Gowdeyana punctifera (Malloch, 1915)
- Gowdeyana ryckmani (James, 1965)
- Gowdeyana varipes James, 1980
- Gowdeyana vitrisetosa (Lindner, 1935)
