= Psephiocera =

Scientific classification
- Kingdom: Animalia
- Phylum: Arthropoda
- Clade: Pancrustacea
- Class: Insecta
- Order: Diptera
- Family: Stratiomyidae
- Subfamily: Pachygastrinae
- Genus: Psephiocera; Enderlein, 1914

Type species
- Psephiocera flavipes Enderlein, 1914

Synonyms
- Cephiocera Curran, 1928

Genus of flies

Psephiocera is a genus of flies in the family Stratiomyidae.

== Species ==
- Psephiocera callosa James, 1967
- Psephiocera cognata (Lindner, 1949)
- Psephiocera flavipes Enderlein, 1914
- Psephiocera marginata James, 1967
- Psephiocera modesta (Lindner, 1949)
- Psephiocera superba (Lindner, 1949)
