= Diademophora =

Scientific classification
- Kingdom: Animalia
- Phylum: Arthropoda
- Clade: Pancrustacea
- Class: Insecta
- Order: Diptera
- Family: Stratiomyidae
- Subfamily: Pachygastrinae
- Genus: Diademophora; Lindner, 1955

Type species
- Diademophora ruandaensis Lindner, 1955

Genus of flies

Diademophora is a genus of flies in the family Stratiomyidae.

== Species ==
- Diademophora ruandaensis Lindner, 1955
