= Nyplatys =

Scientific classification
- Kingdom: Animalia
- Phylum: Arthropoda
- Class: Insecta
- Order: Diptera
- Family: Stratiomyidae
- Subfamily: Pachygastrinae
- Genus: Nyplatys; Séguy, 1938

Type species
- Nyplatys niger Séguy, 1938

Genus of flies

Nyplatys is a genus of flies in the family Stratiomyidae.

== Species ==
- Nyplatys cultellata (Lindner, 1939)
- Nyplatys niger Séguy, 1938
