= Platynomorpha =

Scientific classification
- Kingdom: Animalia
- Phylum: Arthropoda
- Class: Insecta
- Order: Diptera
- Family: Stratiomyidae
- Subfamily: Pachygastrinae
- Genus: Platynomorpha; Grünberg, 1915

Type species
- Platynomorpha doryphora Grünberg, 1915

Genus of flies

Platynomorpha is a genus of flies in the family Stratiomyidae.

== Distribution ==
Democratic Republic of the Congo, Liberia, Republic of the Congo, Equatorial Guinea, Cameroun.

== Species ==
- Platynomorpha doryphora Grünberg, 1915
