= Damaromyia =

Scientific classification
- Kingdom: Animalia
- Phylum: Arthropoda
- Clade: Pancrustacea
- Class: Insecta
- Order: Diptera
- Family: Stratiomyidae
- Subfamily: Pachygastrinae
- Genus: Damaromyia; Kertész, 1916

Genus of flies

Damaromyia is a genus of flies in the family Stratiomyidae.

== Species ==
- Damaromyia bifossa Hardy, 1931
- Damaromyia clivosa Hardy, 1931
- Damaromyia confusa Hardy, 1931
- Damaromyia depressa Hardy, 1931
- Damaromyia discolor Hardy, 1931
- Damaromyia hirsuta Hardy, 1931
- Damaromyia interrupta James, 1950
- Damaromyia limbipuncta Hardy, 1931
- Damaromyia neohirsuta Hardy, 1939
- Damaromyia nitens (Hardy, 1922)
- Damaromyia racemipuncta Hardy, 1931
- Damaromyia similis Hardy, 1939
- Damaromyia tasmanica Kertész, 1916
- Damaromyia trina Hardy, 1931
- Damaromyia whitei (Hardy, 1920)
