= Aidomyia =

Scientific classification
- Kingdom: Animalia
- Phylum: Arthropoda
- Class: Insecta
- Order: Diptera
- Family: Stratiomyidae
- Subfamily: Pachygastrinae
- Genus: Aidomyia; Kertész, 1916

Type species
- Aidomyia femoralis Kertész, 1916

Genus of flies

Aidomyia is a genus of flies in the family Stratiomyidae.

== Species ==
- Aidomyia femoralis Kertész, 1916
- Aidomyia glabrifrons James, 1977
- Aidomyia nitens James, 1977
- Aidomyia snyderi James, 1962
- Aidomyia tomentosa James, 1977
