= Peltina =

Scientific classification
- Kingdom: Animalia
- Phylum: Arthropoda
- Class: Insecta
- Order: Diptera
- Family: Stratiomyidae
- Subfamily: Pachygastrinae
- Genus: Peltina; Lindner, 1964

Type species
- Peltina fuliginosa Lindner, 1964

Genus of flies

Peltina is a genus of flies in the family Stratiomyidae.

== Species ==
- Peltina cazieri (James, 1953)
- Peltina fuliginosa Lindner, 1964
- Peltina nigrimanus James, 1972
