= Toxopeusomyia =

Scientific classification
- Kingdom: Animalia
- Phylum: Arthropoda
- Class: Insecta
- Order: Diptera
- Family: Stratiomyidae
- Subfamily: Pachygastrinae
- Genus: Toxopeusomyia; Lindner, 1957

Type species
- Toxopeusomyia flavitarsis Lindner, 1957

Genus of flies

Toxopeusomyia is a genus of flies in the family Stratiomyidae.

== Species ==
- Toxopeusomyia flavitarsis Lindner, 1957
