= Brachyodina =

Scientific classification
- Kingdom: Animalia
- Phylum: Arthropoda
- Class: Insecta
- Order: Diptera
- Family: Stratiomyidae
- Subfamily: Pachygastrinae
- Genus: Brachyodina; Lindner, 1949

Type species
- Brachyodina niveioscula Lindner, 1949

Genus of flies

Brachyodina is a genus of flies in the family Stratiomyidae.

== Species ==
- Brachyodina caymanensis Woodley, 2014
- Brachyodina depressa (James, 1967)
- Brachyodina dorsata (Johnson, 1920)
- Brachyodina insularis (James, 1966)
- Brachyodina janestanleyae Woodley, 2014
- Brachyodina metzi (Johnson, 1919)
- Brachyodina niveioscula Lindner, 1949
- Brachyodina tomentosa (James, 1974)
