= Aspidacanthina =

Scientific classification
- Kingdom: Animalia
- Phylum: Arthropoda
- Class: Insecta
- Order: Diptera
- Family: Stratiomyidae
- Subfamily: Pachygastrinae
- Genus: Aspidacanthina; Lindner, 1966

Type species
- Aspidacanthina exigua Lindner, 1966

Genus of flies

Aspidacanthina is a genus of flies in the family Stratiomyidae.

== Species ==
- Aspidacanthina exigua Lindner, 1966
