= Ligyromyia =

Scientific classification
- Kingdom: Animalia
- Phylum: Arthropoda
- Class: Insecta
- Order: Diptera
- Family: Stratiomyidae
- Subfamily: Pachygastrinae
- Genus: Ligyromyia; Kertész, 1916

Type species
- Ligyromyia columbiana Kertész, 1916

Genus of flies

Ligyromyia is a genus of flies in the family Stratiomyidae.

== Distribution ==
Colombia.

== Species ==
- Ligyromyia columbiana Kertész, 1916
