= Hypselophrum =

Scientific classification
- Kingdom: Animalia
- Phylum: Arthropoda
- Class: Insecta
- Order: Diptera
- Family: Stratiomyidae
- Subfamily: Pachygastrinae
- Genus: Hypselophrum; Kertész, 1909
- Species: H. cyphomyioides

Binomial name
- Hypselophrum cyphomyioides Kertész, 1909

Synonyms
- Genus synonymy: Hypselaphrum Pleske, 1924

Genus of flies

Hypselophrum is a genus of flies in the family Stratiomyidae. Its only species is Hypselophrum cyphomyioides. It is found in Peru.
