= Ptilinoxus =

Scientific classification
- Kingdom: Animalia
- Phylum: Arthropoda
- Class: Insecta
- Order: Diptera
- Family: Stratiomyidae
- Subfamily: Pachygastrinae
- Genus: Ptilinoxus; Lindner, 1966

Type species
- Ptilinoxus fallax Lindner, 1966

Synonyms
- Leucacron Lindner, 1966 (Lindner, 1966)

Genus of flies

Ptilinoxus is a genus of flies in the family Stratiomyidae.

== Species ==
- Ptilinoxus fallax Lindner, 1966
- Ptilinoxus interruptum (Lindner, 1966)
