= Chlamydonotum =

Scientific classification
- Kingdom: Animalia
- Phylum: Arthropoda
- Class: Insecta
- Order: Diptera
- Family: Stratiomyidae
- Subfamily: Pachygastrinae
- Genus: Chlamydonotum; Lindner, 1949

Type species
- Chlamydonotum nigreradiatum Lindner, 1949

Genus of flies

Chlamydonotum is a genus of flies in the family Stratiomyidae.

== Distribution ==
Brazil.

== Species ==
- Chlamydonotum nigreradiatum Lindner, 1949
