= Otionigera =

Scientific classification
- Kingdom: Animalia
- Phylum: Arthropoda
- Class: Insecta
- Order: Diptera
- Family: Stratiomyidae
- Subfamily: Pachygastrinae
- Genus: Otionigera; Lindner, 1966

Type species
- Otionigera acuticornis Lindner, 1966

Synonyms
- Otinigera Lindner, 1966

Genus of flies

Otionigera is a genus of flies in the family Stratiomyidae.

== Distribution ==
Madagascar.

== Species ==
- Otionigera acuticornis Lindner, 1966
