= Popanomyia =

Scientific classification
- Kingdom: Animalia
- Phylum: Arthropoda
- Class: Insecta
- Order: Diptera
- Family: Stratiomyidae
- Subfamily: Pachygastrinae
- Genus: Popanomyia; Kertész, 1909

Type species
- Popanomyia femoralis Kertész, 1909

Genus of flies

Popanomyia is a genus of flies in the family Stratiomyidae.

== Species ==
- Popanomyia femoralis Kertész, 1909
- Popanomyia kerteszi James & Woodley, 1980
