= Clarissimyia =

Scientific classification
- Kingdom: Animalia
- Phylum: Arthropoda
- Class: Insecta
- Order: Diptera
- Family: Stratiomyidae
- Subfamily: Pachygastrinae
- Genus: Clarissimyia; Woodley, 2001

Type species
- Clarissa pallipes Lindner, 1964

Synonyms
- Clarissa Lindner, 1964

Genus of flies

Clarissimyia is a genus of flies in the family Stratiomyidae.

== Distribution ==
Brazil.

== Species ==
- Clarissimyia pallipes (Lindner, 1964)
