= Strobilaspis =

Scientific classification
- Kingdom: Animalia
- Phylum: Arthropoda
- Class: Insecta
- Order: Diptera
- Family: Stratiomyidae
- Subfamily: Pachygastrinae
- Genus: Strobilaspis; Lindner, 1949

Type species
- Strobilaspis nigrimana Lindner, 1949

Genus of flies

Strobilaspis is a genus of flies in the family Stratiomyidae.

== Species ==
- Strobilaspis flavitarsis James, 1980
- Strobilaspis nigrimana Lindner, 1949
- Strobilaspis picta James, 1980
