= Asyncritula =

Scientific classification
- Kingdom: Animalia
- Phylum: Arthropoda
- Class: Insecta
- Order: Diptera
- Family: Stratiomyidae
- Subfamily: Pachygastrinae
- Genus: Asyncritula; Strand, 1929

Synonyms
- Asyncritus Kertész, 1914

Genus of flies

Asyncritula is a genus of flies in the family Stratiomyidae.

== Species ==
- Asyncritula brevis James, 1978
- Asyncritula limbipennis (Wulp, 1898)
- Asyncritula pubescens James, 1978
