= Chelonomima =

Scientific classification
- Kingdom: Animalia
- Phylum: Arthropoda
- Clade: Pancrustacea
- Class: Insecta
- Order: Diptera
- Family: Stratiomyidae
- Subfamily: Pachygastrinae
- Genus: Chelonomima; Enderlein, 1914

Type species
- Chelonomima partiticeps Enderlein, 1914

Genus of flies

Chelonomima is a genus of flies in the family Stratiomyidae.

== Species ==
- Chelonomima gracilis James, 1949
- Chelonomima partiticeps Enderlein, 1914
- Chelonomima proloxocera Speiser, 1922
- Chelonomima signata Meijere, 1924
