= Apotomaspis =

Scientific classification
- Kingdom: Animalia
- Phylum: Arthropoda
- Class: Insecta
- Order: Diptera
- Family: Stratiomyidae
- Subfamily: Pachygastrinae
- Genus: Apotomaspis; Lindner, 1972

Type species
- Apotomaspis nigeriana Lindner, 1972

Genus of flies

Apotomaspis is a genus of flies in the family Stratiomyidae.

== Distribution ==
Nigeria.

== Species ==
- Apotomaspis nigeriana Lindner, 1972
