= Cosmariomyia =

Scientific classification
- Kingdom: Animalia
- Phylum: Arthropoda
- Class: Insecta
- Order: Diptera
- Family: Stratiomyidae
- Subfamily: Pachygastrinae
- Genus: Cosmariomyia; Kertész, 1914

Type species
- Cosmariomyia argyrosticta Kertész, 1914

Genus of flies

Cosmariomyia is a genus of flies in the family Stratiomyidae.

== Species ==
- Cosmariomyia albarista James, 1980
- Cosmariomyia argyrosticta Kertész, 1914
- Cosmariomyia pallidipennis (Williston, 1901)
