= Pedinocera =

Scientific classification
- Kingdom: Animalia
- Phylum: Arthropoda
- Class: Insecta
- Order: Diptera
- Family: Stratiomyidae
- Subfamily: Pachygastrinae
- Genus: Pedinocera; Kertész, 1909

Type species
- Pedinocera longicornis Kertész, 1909

Genus of flies

Pedinocera is a genus of flies in the family Stratiomyidae.

== Distribution ==
Peru.

== Species ==
- Pedinocera longicornis Kertész, 1909
