= Borboridea =

Scientific classification
- Kingdom: Animalia
- Phylum: Arthropoda
- Class: Insecta
- Order: Diptera
- Family: Stratiomyidae
- Subfamily: Pachygastrinae
- Genus: Borboridea; Kertész, 1916

Type species
- Borboridea megaspis Kertész, 1916

Genus of flies

Borboridea is a genus of flies in the family Stratiomyidae.

== Species ==
- Borboridea megaspis Kertész, 1916
- Borboridea microcephalum (Kraft & Cook, 1961)
