= Pegadomyia =

Scientific classification
- Kingdom: Animalia
- Phylum: Arthropoda
- Class: Insecta
- Order: Diptera
- Family: Stratiomyidae
- Subfamily: Pachygastrinae
- Genus: Pegadomyia; Kertész, 1916

Type species
- Pegadomyia pruinosa Kertész, 1916

Genus of flies

Pegadomyia is a genus of flies in the family Stratiomyidae.

== Species ==
- Pegadomyia ceylonica Rozkošný & Kovac, 2008
- Pegadomyia nana Rozkošný & Kovac, 2008
- Pegadomyia nasuta Rozkošný & Kovac, 2008
- Pegadomyia pruinosa Kertész, 1916
