= Pachyacantha =

Scientific classification
- Kingdom: Animalia
- Phylum: Arthropoda
- Class: Insecta
- Order: Diptera
- Family: Stratiomyidae
- Subfamily: Pachygastrinae
- Genus: Pachyacantha; Lindner, 1952

Genus of flies

Pachyacantha is a genus of flies in the family Stratiomyidae.

== Distribution ==
South Africa.

== Species ==
- Pachyacantha crassiventris Lindner, 1952
