= Charisina =

Scientific classification
- Kingdom: Animalia
- Phylum: Arthropoda
- Class: Insecta
- Order: Diptera
- Family: Stratiomyidae
- Subfamily: Pachygastrinae
- Genus: Charisina; Lindner, 1951

Type species
- Charisina angustifrons Lindner, 1951

Genus of flies

Charisina is a genus of flies in the family Stratiomyidae.

== Species ==
- Charisina angustifrons Lindner, 1951
