= Pithomyia =

Scientific classification
- Kingdom: Animalia
- Phylum: Arthropoda
- Class: Insecta
- Order: Diptera
- Family: Stratiomyidae
- Subfamily: Pachygastrinae
- Genus: Pithomyia; Kertész, 1916

Type species
- Pithomyia laevifrons Kertész, 1916

Genus of flies

Pithomyia is a genus of flies in the family Stratiomyidae.

== Species ==
- Pithomyia laevifrons Kertész, 1916
- Pithomyia stuckenbergi James, 1975
