= Glochinomyia =

Scientific classification
- Kingdom: Animalia
- Phylum: Arthropoda
- Class: Insecta
- Order: Diptera
- Family: Stratiomyidae
- Subfamily: Pachygastrinae
- Genus: Glochinomyia; Kertész, 1916
- Species: G. albiseta

Binomial name
- Glochinomyia albiseta Kertész, 1916

Genus of flies

Glochinomyia is a genus of flies in the family Stratiomyidae. Its only species is Glochinomyia albiseta. It is found in Papua New Guinea.
