= Leveromyia =

Scientific classification
- Kingdom: Animalia
- Phylum: Arthropoda
- Class: Insecta
- Order: Diptera
- Family: Stratiomyidae
- Subfamily: Pachygastrinae
- Genus: Leveromyia; Lindner, 1937

Type species
- Leveromyia geniculata Lindner, 1937

Genus of flies

Leveromyia is a genus of flies in the family Stratiomyidae.

== Species ==
- Leveromyia geniculata Lindner, 1937
- Leveromyia lindneri James, 1978
