= Cynipimorpha =

Scientific classification
- Kingdom: Animalia
- Phylum: Arthropoda
- Class: Insecta
- Order: Diptera
- Family: Stratiomyidae
- Subfamily: Pachygastrinae
- Genus: Cynipimorpha; Brauer, 1882

Type species
- Cynipimorpha bilimecki Brauer, 1882

Synonyms
- Cynipomorha Kertész, 1916; Cynipomorpha Enderlein, 1914; Cactobia James, 1966

Genus of flies

Cynipimorpha is a genus of flies in the family Stratiomyidae.

== Distribution ==
Mexico.

== Species ==
- Cynipimorpha bilimecki Brauer, 1882
