= Pseudocyphomyia =

Scientific classification
- Kingdom: Animalia
- Phylum: Arthropoda
- Class: Insecta
- Order: Diptera
- Family: Stratiomyidae
- Subfamily: Pachygastrinae
- Genus: Pseudocyphomyia; Kertész, 1916

Type species
- Pseudocyphomyia mimetica Kertész, 1916

Genus of flies

Pseudocyphomyia is a genus of flies in the family Stratiomyidae.

== Species ==
- Pseudocyphomyia mimetica Kertész, 1916
