= Goetghebueromyia =

Scientific classification
- Kingdom: Animalia
- Phylum: Arthropoda
- Class: Insecta
- Order: Diptera
- Family: Stratiomyidae
- Subfamily: Pachygastrinae
- Genus: Goetghebueromyia; Lindner, 1938

Type species
- Goetghebueromyia paradoxa Lindner, 1938

Genus of flies

Goetghebueromyia is a genus of flies in the family Stratiomyidae.

== Distribution ==
Congo.

== Species ==
- Goetghebueromyia paradoxa Lindner, 1938
