= Cardopomyia =

Scientific classification
- Kingdom: Animalia
- Phylum: Arthropoda
- Class: Insecta
- Order: Diptera
- Family: Stratiomyidae
- Subfamily: Pachygastrinae
- Genus: Cardopomyia; Kertész, 1916

Type species
- Cardopomyia robusta Kertész, 1916

Synonyms
- Physometopon Lindner, 1966

Genus of flies

Cardopomyia is a genus of flies in the family Stratiomyidae. The genus is endemic to Madagascar.

== Species ==
- Cardopomyia parvicornis (Lindner, 1959)
- Cardopomyia robusta Kertész, 1916
- Physometopon vesicularis Lindner, 1966
