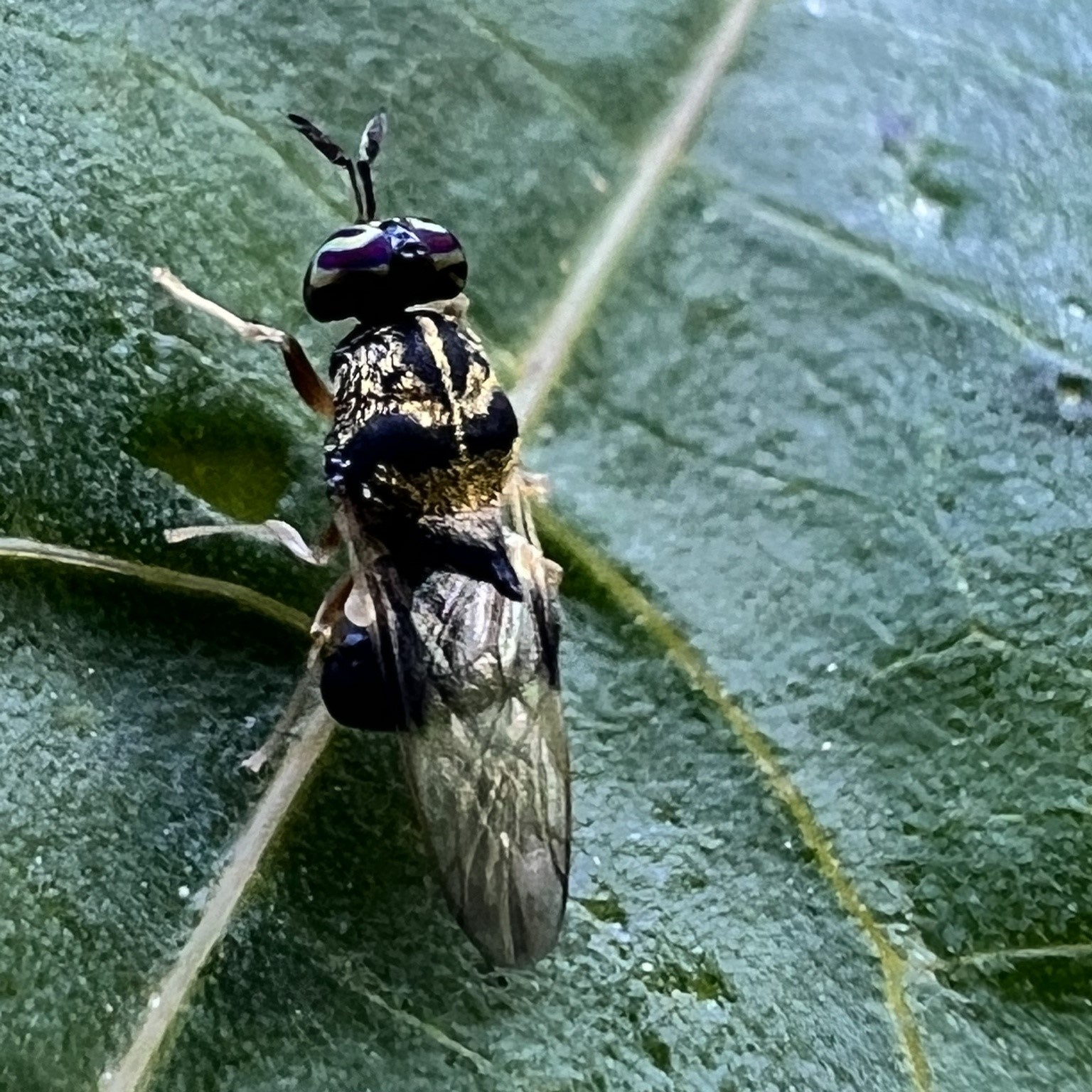
- Chalcidomorphina aurata

Scientific classification
- Kingdom: Animalia
- Phylum: Arthropoda
- Clade: Pancrustacea
- Class: Insecta
- Order: Diptera
- Family: Stratiomyidae
- Subfamily: Pachygastrinae
- Genus: Chalcidomorphina; Enderlein, 1914

Type species
- Chalcidomorphina aurata Enderlein, 1914

Synonyms
- Calcidomorphina Lindner, 1949; Calcomorphina James, 1967

= Chalcidomorphina =

Genus of flies

Chalcidomorphina is a genus of flies in the family Stratiomyidae.

== Species ==
- Chalcidomorphina argentea McFadden, 1980
- Chalcidomorphina aurata Enderlein, 1914
- Chalcidomorphina planes James, 1967
- Chalcidomorphina terataspis James, 1974
