= Thylacognathus =

Scientific classification
- Kingdom: Animalia
- Phylum: Arthropoda
- Class: Insecta
- Order: Diptera
- Family: Stratiomyidae
- Subfamily: Pachygastrinae
- Genus: Thylacognathus; Kertész, 1916

Type species
- Thylacognathus lativentris Wulp, 1898

Genus of flies

Thylacognathus is a genus of flies in the family Stratiomyidae.

== Species ==
- Thylacognathus lativentris (Wulp, 1898)
