= Craspedometopon =

Scientific classification
- Kingdom: Animalia
- Phylum: Arthropoda
- Class: Insecta
- Order: Diptera
- Family: Stratiomyidae
- Subfamily: Pachygastrinae
- Genus: Craspedometopon; Kertész, 1909

Type species
- Craspedometopon frontale Kertész, 1909

Genus of flies

Craspedometopon is a genus of flies in the family Stratiomyidae.

== Species ==
- Craspedometopon frontale Kertész, 1909
- Craspedometopon orientale Rozkošný & Kovac, 2007
- Craspedometopon spina Yang, Wei & Yang, 2010
- Craspedometopon tibetense Yang, Zhang & Li, 2014
- Craspedometopon ussuricum Krivosheina, 1973
