= Gnorismomyia =

Scientific classification
- Kingdom: Animalia
- Phylum: Arthropoda
- Class: Insecta
- Order: Diptera
- Family: Stratiomyidae
- Subfamily: Pachygastrinae
- Genus: Gnorismomyia; Kertész, 1914
- Species: G. flavicornis

Binomial name
- Gnorismomyia flavicornis Kertész, 1914

Genus of flies

Gnorismomyia is a genus of flies in the family Stratiomyidae. Its only species is Gnorismomyia flavicornis. It is found in Taiwan.
