= Abrosiomyia =

Scientific classification
- Kingdom: Animalia
- Phylum: Arthropoda
- Clade: Pancrustacea
- Class: Insecta
- Order: Diptera
- Family: Stratiomyidae
- Subfamily: Pachygastrinae
- Genus: Abrosiomyia; Kertész, 1914

Type species
- Abrosiomyia minuta Kertész, 1914

Genus of flies

Abrosiomyia is a genus of flies in the family Stratiomyidae.

== Species ==
- Abrosiomyia bella Nagatomi, 1975
- Abrosiomyia flavipes Yang, Zhang & Li, 2014
- Abrosiomyia minuta Kertész, 1914
