= Pseudoxymyia =

Scientific classification
- Kingdom: Animalia
- Phylum: Arthropoda
- Class: Insecta
- Order: Diptera
- Family: Stratiomyidae
- Subfamily: Pachygastrinae
- Genus: Pseudoxymyia; Lindner, 1959

Type species
- Pseudoxymyia flavitarsis Lindner, 1959

Genus of flies

Pseudoxymyia is a genus of flies in the family Stratiomyidae.

== Species ==
- Pseudoxymyia flavitarsis Lindner, 1959
