= Platylobium (fly) =

Scientific classification
- Kingdom: Animalia
- Phylum: Arthropoda
- Class: Insecta
- Order: Diptera
- Family: Stratiomyidae
- Subfamily: Pachygastrinae
- Genus: Platylobium; Lindner, 1933

Type species
- Platylobium zurstrasseni Lindner, 1933

Genus of flies

Platylobium is a genus of flies in the family Stratiomyidae.

== Distribution ==
Peru.

== Species ==
- Platylobium zurstrasseni Lindner, 1933
