= Abiomyia =

Scientific classification
- Kingdom: Animalia
- Phylum: Arthropoda
- Clade: Pancrustacea
- Class: Insecta
- Order: Diptera
- Family: Stratiomyidae
- Subfamily: Pachygastrinae
- Genus: Abiomyia; Kertész, 1914

Type species
- Abiomyia annulipes Kertész, 1914

Genus of flies

Abiomyia is a genus of flies in the family Stratiomyidae.

== Species ==
- Abiomyia annulipes Kertész, 1914
- Abiomyia brunnipes Yang, Zhang & Li, 2014
- Abiomyia higona Nagatomi, 1975
- Abiomyia pallipes Brunetti, 1927
