= Dialampsis =

Scientific classification
- Kingdom: Animalia
- Phylum: Arthropoda
- Class: Insecta
- Order: Diptera
- Family: Stratiomyidae
- Subfamily: Pachygastrinae
- Genus: Dialampsis; Kertész, 1916

Type species
- Dialampsis argentata Wulp, 1898

Genus of flies

Dialampsis is a genus of flies in the family Stratiomyidae.

== Distribution ==
Papua New Guinea.

== Species ==
- Dialampsis argentata (Wulp, 1898)
