= Burmabrithes =

Scientific classification
- Kingdom: Animalia
- Phylum: Arthropoda
- Class: Insecta
- Order: Diptera
- Family: Stratiomyidae
- Subfamily: Pachygastrinae
- Genus: Burmabrithes; Lindner, 1937

Type species
- Burmabrithes annulipes Lindner, 1937

Genus of flies

Burmabrithes is a genus of flies in the family Stratiomyidae.

== Distribution ==
Myanmar.

== Species ==
- Burmabrithes annulipes Lindner, 1937
