= Keiseria =

Scientific classification
- Kingdom: Animalia
- Phylum: Arthropoda
- Class: Insecta
- Order: Diptera
- Family: Stratiomyidae
- Subfamily: Pachygastrinae
- Genus: Keiseria; Lindner, 1980

Type species
- Keiseria rubicunda Lindner, 1966

Synonyms
- Keiseria Lindner, 1966

Genus of flies

Keiseria is a genus of flies in the family Stratiomyidae.

== Distribution ==
Madagascar.

== Species ==
- Keiseria amoena Lindner, 1966
- Keiseria fasciata Lindner, 1966
- Keiseria lunaris Lindner, 1968
- Keiseria praescutellata Lindner, 1966
- Keiseria rubicunda Lindner, 1966
