= Ornopyramis =

Scientific classification
- Kingdom: Animalia
- Phylum: Arthropoda
- Class: Insecta
- Order: Diptera
- Family: Stratiomyidae
- Subfamily: Pachygastrinae
- Genus: Ornopyramis; Krivosheina, 1973

Type species
- Ornopyramis tener Krivosheina, 1973

Genus of flies

Ornopyramis is a genus of flies in the family Stratiomyidae.

== Species ==
- Ornopyramis tener Krivosheina, 1973
