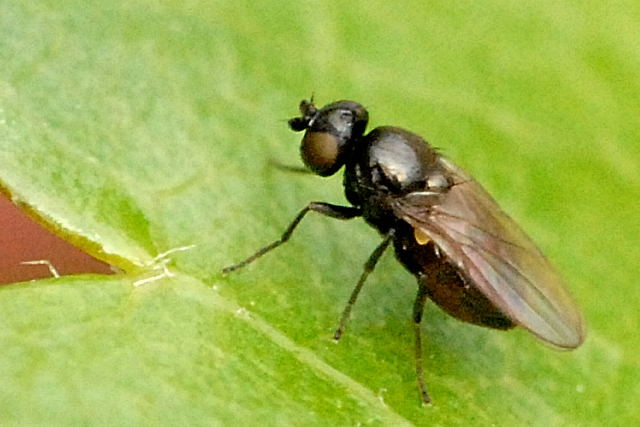
- Zabrachia tenella

Scientific classification
- Kingdom: Animalia
- Phylum: Arthropoda
- Clade: Pancrustacea
- Class: Insecta
- Order: Diptera
- Family: Stratiomyidae
- Subfamily: Pachygastrinae

= Pachygastrinae =

Subfamily of flies

Pachygastrinae is a subfamily of flies in the family Stratiomyidae.

== Genera ==
- Abiomyia Kertész, 1914
- Abrosiomyia Kertész, 1914
- Acanthinomyia Hunter, 1901
- Acyrocera Lindner, 1937
- Acyrocerops James, 1978
- Adraga Walker, 1858
- Ageiton Kertész, 1914
- Aidomyia Kertész, 1916
- Alliophleps Becker, 1908
- Anargemus Lindner, 1965
- Ankylacantha Lindner, 1955
- Anomalacanthimyia Woodley, 2001
- Apotomaspis Lindner, 1972
- Argyrobrithes Grünberg, 1915
- Artemita Walker, 1854
- Artemitomima James, 1948
- Ashantina Kertész, 1914
- Aspidacantha Kertész, 1916
- Aspidacanthina Lindner, 1966
- Asyncritula Strand, 1929
- Aulana Walker, 1864
- Berkshiria Johnson, 1914
- Bistinda Bezzi, 1928
- Blastocera Gerstaecker, 1857
- Borboridea Kertész, 1916
- Brachyodina Lindner, 1949
- Burmabrithes Lindner, 1937
- Caenacantha Wulp, 1885
- Camptopteromyia Meijere, 1914
- Cardopomyia Kertész, 1916
- Cechorismenus Kertész, 1916
- Chalcidomorphina Enderlein, 1914
- Charisina Lindner, 1951
- Chelonomima Enderlein, 1914
- Chlamydonotum Lindner, 1949
- Chorophthalmyia Lindner, 1964
- Cibotogaster Enderlein, 1914
- Clarissimyia Woodley, 2001
- Cosmariomyia Kertész, 1914
- Craspedometopon Kertész, 1909
- Culcua Walker, 1856
- Cyclotaspis Lindner, 1964
- Cynipimorpha Brauer, 1882
- Dactylacantha Lindner, 1964
- Dactylodeictes Kertész, 1914
- Dactylotinda Lindner, 1965
- Damaromyia Kertész, 1916
- Diademophora Lindner, 1955
- Dialampsis Kertész, 1916
- Diargemus Kertész, 1916
- Diastophthalmus Lindner, 1949
- Diplephippium Speiser, 1908
- Diplopeltina Lindner, 1972
- Dochmiocera Hardy, 1922
- Drosimomyia Kertész, 1916
- Ecchaetomyia Lindner, 1949
- Eicochalcidina Lindner, 1964
- Eidalimus Kertész, 1914
- Engicerus Lindner, 1964
- Enypnium Kertész, 1914
- Eufijia Bezzi, 1928
- Eupachygaster Kertész, 1911
- Evaza Walker, 1856
- Gabaza Walker, 1858
- Glochinomyia Kertész, 1916
- Gnesiomyia Kertész, 1914
- Gnorismomyia Kertész, 1914
- Goetghebueromyia Lindner, 1938
- Gowdeyana Curran, 1928
- Haplofijia Bezzi, 1928
- Hermetiomima Grünberg, 1915
- Hexacraspis Enderlein, 1914
- Hypoceromys Lindner, 1935
- Hypselophrum Kertész, 1909
- Isomerocera Enderlein, 1914
- Keiseria Lindner, 1980
- Kolomania Pleske, 1924
- Lampetiopus Lindner, 1936
- Lasiodeictes Lindner, 1964
- Lenomyia Kertész, 1916
- Leveromyia Lindner, 1937
- Ligyromyia Kertész, 1916
- Lonchegaster White, 1914
- Lophoteles Loew, 1858
- Lyprotemyia Kertész, 1909
- Maackiana Krivosheina, 1973
- Madagascara Lindner, 1936
- Madagascarina Lindner, 1967
- Manotes Kertész, 1916
- Marangua Lindner, 1960
- Meristocera Lindner, 1964
- Meristomeringina James, 1952
- Meristomerinx Enderlein, 1914
- Monacanthomyia Brunetti, 1912
- Mycterocera James, 1967
- Myiocavia Lindner, 1949
- Neoacanthina Kertész, 1914
- Neochauna Williston, 1896
- Neopachygaster Austen, 1901
- Netrogramma Lindner, 1964
- Nyplatys Séguy, 1938
- Obrapa Walker, 1858
- Ornopyramis Krivosheina, 1973
- Otionigera Lindner, 1966
- Oxymyia Kertész, 1916
- Pachyacantha Lindner, 1952
- Pachyberis James, 1975
- Pachygaster Meigen, 1803
- Panacridops James & Woodley, 1980
- Panacris Gerstaecker, 1857
- Pangomyia James, 1978
- Paracanthinomyia Lindner, 1964
- Paracechorismenus Kertész, 1916
- Paradraga James, 1980
- Parastratiosphecomyia Brunetti, 1923
- Parevaza James, 1978
- Pedinocera Kertész, 1909
- Pedinocerops James, 1980
- Pegadomyia Kertész, 1916
- Peltina Lindner, 1964
- Peratomastix Enderlein, 1914
- Pithomyia Kertész, 1916
- Platylobium Lindner, 1933
- Platyna Wiedemann, 1824
- Platynomorpha Grünberg, 1915
- Platynomyia Kertész, 1916
- Popanomyia Kertész, 1909
- Pristaspis Bezzi, 1928
- Proegmenomyia Kertész, 1914
- Psapharomys Grünberg, 1915
- Psephiocera Enderlein, 1914
- Pseudocyphomyia Kertész, 1916
- Pseudomeristomerinx Hollis, 1963
- Pseudoxymyia Lindner, 1959
- Ptilinoxus Lindner, 1966
- Ptilocera Wiedemann, 1820
- Raphanocera Pleske, 1922
- Rosapha Walker, 1859
- Rosaphula Frey, 1934
- Salduba Walker, 1858
- Saldubella Kertész, 1916
- Saruga Walker, 1859
- Sathroptera Kertész, 1914
- Sphaerofijia Bezzi, 1928
- Steleoceromys Grünberg, 1915
- Sternobrithes Loew, 1856
- Stratiosphecomyia Brunetti, 1913
- Strobilaspis Lindner, 1949
- Strophognathus Lindner, 1955
- Synaptochaeta Lindner, 1964
- Tegocera Lindner, 1964
- Thopomyia Kertész, 1916
- Thylacognathus Kertész, 1916
- Tinda Walker, 1859
- Tindacera Lindner, 1961
- Toxopeusomyia Lindner, 1957
- Trichochaeta Bigot, 1878
- Trigonocerina Lindner, 1964
- Vittiger Kertész, 1909
- Weimyia James, 1978
- Xylopachygaster Krivosheina, 1973
- Zabrachia Coquillett, 1901
