= Weimyia =

Scientific classification
- Kingdom: Animalia
- Phylum: Arthropoda
- Class: Insecta
- Order: Diptera
- Family: Stratiomyidae
- Subfamily: Pachygastrinae
- Genus: Weimyia; James, 1978

Type species
- Weimyia bispinosa James, 1978

Genus of flies

Weimyia is a genus of flies in the family Stratiomyidae.

== Species ==
- Weimyia bispinosa James, 1978
