= Eufijia =

Scientific classification
- Kingdom: Animalia
- Phylum: Arthropoda
- Clade: Pancrustacea
- Class: Insecta
- Order: Diptera
- Family: Stratiomyidae
- Subfamily: Pachygastrinae
- Genus: Eufijia; Bezzi, 1928

Type species
- Eufijia albicornis Bezzi, 1928

Genus of flies

Eufijia is a genus of flies in the family Stratiomyidae.

== Species ==
- Eufijia albicornis Bezzi, 1928
- Eufijia dimidiata Bezzi, 1928
- Eufijia flavinervis Bezzi, 1928
- Eufijia ovalis James, 1950
- Eufijia tarsalis Bezzi, 1928
- Eufijia tibialis Bezzi, 1928
