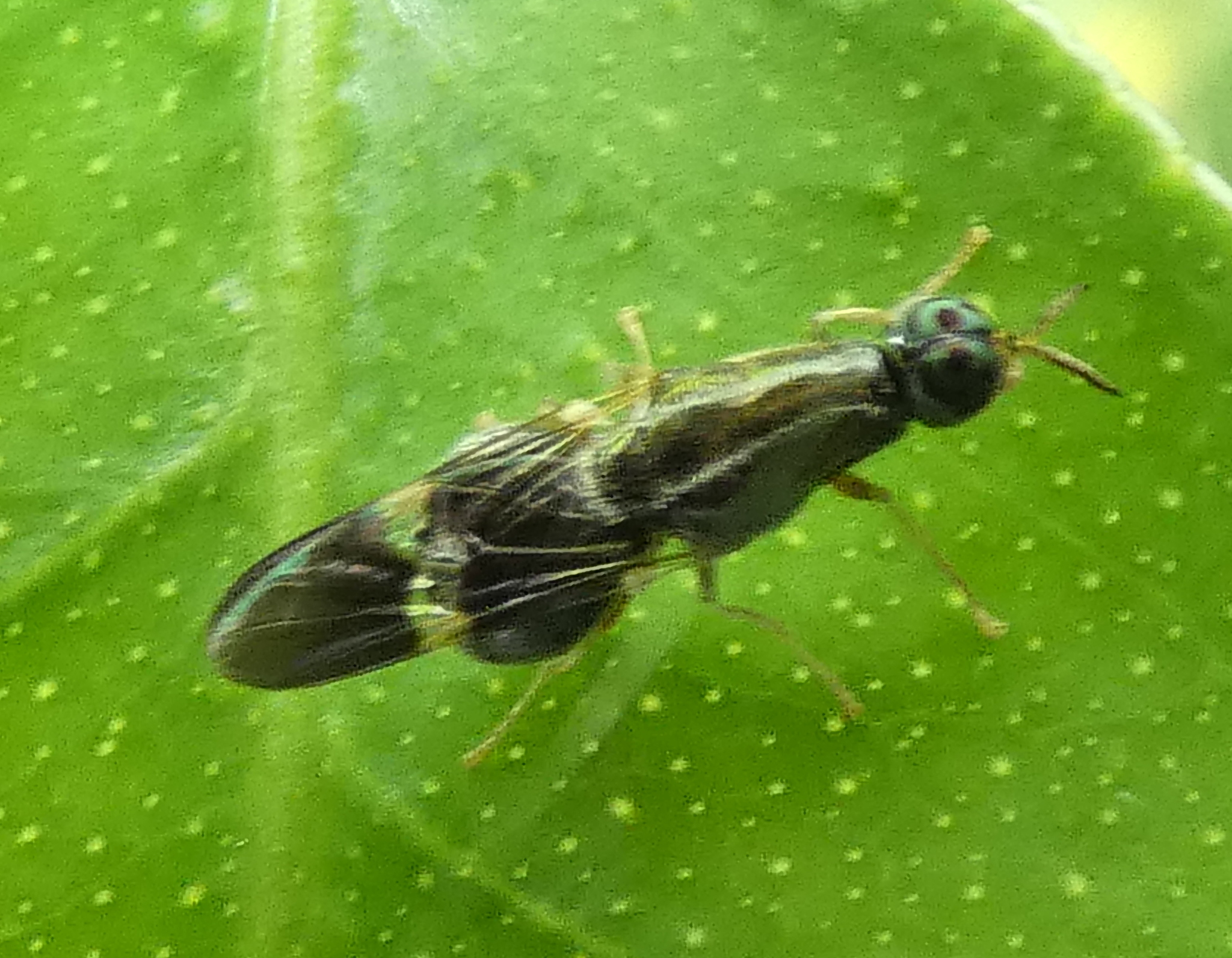
- Acanthinomyia elongata

Scientific classification
- Kingdom: Animalia
- Phylum: Arthropoda
- Class: Insecta
- Order: Diptera
- Family: Stratiomyidae
- Subfamily: Pachygastrinae
- Genus: Acanthinomyia; Hunter, 1900

Type species
- Acanthinomyia elongata Wiedemann, 1824

Synonyms
- Acanthina Wiedemann, 1830; Acanthinia Macquart, 1834

= Acanthinomyia =

Genus of flies

Acanthinomyia is a genus of flies in the family Stratiomyidae.

== Species ==
- Acanthinomyia elongata (Wiedemann, 1824)
- Acanthinomyia longa (Wiedemann, 1830)
- Acanthinomyia plana (Walker, 1854)
