= Platyna =

Scientific classification
- Kingdom: Animalia
- Phylum: Arthropoda
- Clade: Pancrustacea
- Class: Insecta
- Order: Diptera
- Family: Stratiomyidae
- Subfamily: Pachygastrinae
- Genus: Platyna; Wiedemann, 1824

Type species
- Stratiomys hastata Fabricius, 1805

Synonyms
- Placyna Bigot, 1856

Genus of flies

Platyna is a genus of flies in the family Stratiomyidae.

== Species ==
- Platyna hastata (Fabricius, 1805)
