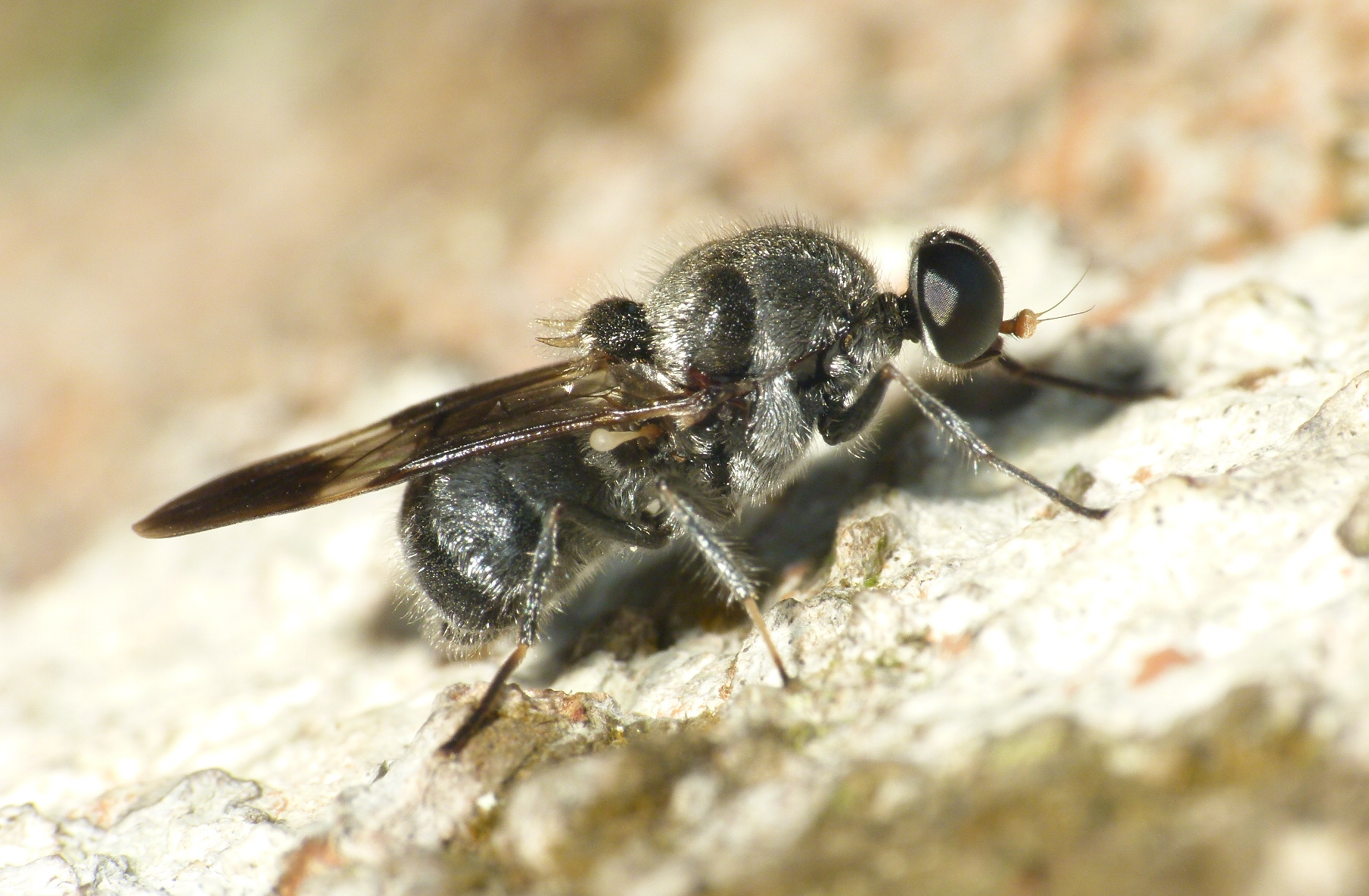
- A Culcua species from India

Scientific classification
- Kingdom: Animalia
- Phylum: Arthropoda
- Class: Insecta
- Order: Diptera
- Family: Stratiomyidae
- Subfamily: Pachygastrinae
- Genus: Culcua; Walker, 1856

Type species
- Culcua simulans Walker, 1856

= Culcua =

Genus of flies

Culcua is a genus of flies in the family Stratiomyidae. that are found only in the Indomalayan realm. About eleven species have been described. They have a disc-shaped flagellum to the antenna and have a arista or hair arising from it. The scutellum typically has four strong spines and the abdomen is nearly spherical

== Species ==
- Culcua albopilosa (Matsumura, 1916)
- Culcua angustimarginata Yang, Zhang & Li, 2014
- Culcua argentea Rozkošný & Kozánek, 2007
- Culcua chaineyi Rozkošný & Kozánek, 2007
- Culcua fasciata Rozkošný & Kozánek, 2007
- Culcua immarginata Yang, Zhang & Li, 2014
- Culcua kolibaci Rozkošný & Kozánek, 2007
- Culcua kovaci Rozkošný & Kozánek, 2007
- Culcua longispina Yang, Zhang & Li, 2014
- Culcua nigra Brunetti, 1924
- Culcua normani Rozkošný & Kozánek, 2007
- Culcua ornans Rozkošný & Kozánek, 2007
- Culcua simulans Walker, 1856
