= Maackiana =

Scientific classification
- Kingdom: Animalia
- Phylum: Arthropoda
- Class: Insecta
- Order: Diptera
- Family: Stratiomyidae
- Subfamily: Pachygastrinae
- Genus: Maackiana; Krivosheina, 1973

Type species
- Maackiana laminiformis Krivosheina, 1973

Genus of flies

Maackiana is a genus of flies in the family Stratiomyidae.

== Species ==
- Maackiana circularis (Nagatomi, 1975)
- Maackiana laminiformis Krivosheina, 1973
