= Artemitomima =

Scientific classification
- Kingdom: Animalia
- Phylum: Arthropoda
- Class: Insecta
- Order: Diptera
- Family: Stratiomyidae
- Subfamily: Pachygastrinae
- Genus: Artemitomima; James, 1948

Type species
- Artemitomima mirabilis James, 1948

Genus of flies

Artemitomima is a genus of flies in the family Stratiomyidae.

== Distribution ==
Vanuatu.

== Species ==
- Artemitomima mirabilis James, 1948
