= Stratiosphecomyia =

Scientific classification
- Kingdom: Animalia
- Phylum: Arthropoda
- Class: Insecta
- Order: Diptera
- Family: Stratiomyidae
- Subfamily: Pachygastrinae
- Genus: Stratiosphecomyia; Brunetti, 1913

Type species
- Stratiosphecomyia variegata Brunetti, 1913

Genus of flies

Stratiosphecomyia is a genus of flies in the family Stratiomyidae.

== Species ==
- Stratiosphecomyia variegata Brunetti, 1913
