= Paradraga =

Scientific classification
- Kingdom: Animalia
- Phylum: Arthropoda
- Class: Insecta
- Order: Diptera
- Family: Stratiomyidae
- Subfamily: Pachygastrinae
- Genus: Paradraga; James, 1980

Type species
- Paradraga omnihirta James, 1980

Genus of flies

Paradraga is a genus of flies in the family Stratiomyidae.

== Distribution ==
Papua New Guinea.

== Species ==
- Paradraga omnihirta James, 1980
