= Manotes (fly) =

Scientific classification
- Kingdom: Animalia
- Phylum: Arthropoda
- Class: Insecta
- Order: Diptera
- Family: Stratiomyidae
- Subfamily: Pachygastrinae
- Genus: Manotes; Kertész, 1916

Type species
- Manotes plana Kertész, 1916

Genus of flies

Manotes is a genus of flies in the family Stratiomyidae.

== Species ==
- Manotes crassimanus James, 1980
- Manotes flavipes James, 1967
- Manotes hyalina James, 1967
- Manotes latimanus James, 1967
- Manotes plana Kertész, 1916
