= Tinda (fly) =

Scientific classification
- Kingdom: Animalia
- Phylum: Arthropoda
- Class: Insecta
- Order: Diptera
- Family: Stratiomyidae
- Subfamily: Pachygastrinae
- Genus: Tinda; Walker, 1859

Type species
- Tinda modifera Walker, 1859

Synonyms
- Phyllophora Macquart, 1835; Phyllophora Macquart, 1838; Biastes Walker, 1851

Genus of flies

Tinda is a genus of flies in the family Stratiomyidae.

== Species ==
- Tinda acanthinoidea (Jaennicke, 1867)
- Tinda cormasa (Walker, 1849)
- Tinda indica (Walker, 1851)
- Tinda javana (Macquart, 1838)
- Tinda maxima Kertész, 1914
- Tinda nigra (Macquart, 1835)
- Tinda vitalisi Brunetti, 1924
