= Pangomyia =

Scientific classification
- Kingdom: Animalia
- Phylum: Arthropoda
- Class: Insecta
- Order: Diptera
- Family: Stratiomyidae
- Subfamily: Pachygastrinae
- Genus: Pangomyia; James, 1978

Type species
- Pangomyia pictipes James, 1978

Genus of flies

Pangomyia is a genus of flies in the family Stratiomyidae.

== Distribution ==
Papua New Guinea.

== Species ==
- Pangomyia pallipes James, 1978
- Pangomyia pictipes James, 1978
