= Raphanocera =

Scientific classification
- Kingdom: Animalia
- Phylum: Arthropoda
- Class: Insecta
- Order: Diptera
- Family: Stratiomyidae
- Subfamily: Pachygastrinae
- Genus: Raphanocera; Pleske, 1922

Type species
- Raphanocera turanica Pleske, 1922

Genus of flies

Raphanocera is a genus of flies in the family Stratiomyidae.

== Species ==
- Raphanocera turanica Pleske, 1922
