= Peratomastix =

Scientific classification
- Kingdom: Animalia
- Phylum: Arthropoda
- Clade: Pancrustacea
- Class: Insecta
- Order: Diptera
- Family: Stratiomyidae
- Subfamily: Pachygastrinae
- Genus: Peratomastix; Enderlein, 1914

Type species
- Peratomastix australis Enderlein, 1914

Synonyms
- Perastomastix Hardy, 1933

Genus of flies

Peratomastix is a genus of flies in the family Stratiomyidae.

== Species ==
- Peratomastix australis Enderlein, 1914
