= Blastocera =

Scientific classification
- Kingdom: Animalia
- Phylum: Arthropoda
- Class: Insecta
- Order: Diptera
- Family: Stratiomyidae
- Subfamily: Pachygastrinae
- Genus: Blastocera; Gerstaecker, 1857

Type species
- Blastocera speciosa Gerstaecker, 1857

Genus of flies

Blastocera is a genus of flies in the family Stratiomyidae.

== Species ==
- Blastocera speciosa Gerstaecker, 1857
