= Trichochaeta =

Scientific classification
- Kingdom: Animalia
- Phylum: Arthropoda
- Class: Insecta
- Order: Diptera
- Family: Stratiomyidae
- Subfamily: Pachygastrinae
- Genus: Trichochaeta; Bigot, 1878

Type species
- Trichochaeta nemoteloides Bigot, 1878

Genus of flies

Trichochaeta is a genus of flies in the family Stratiomyidae.

== Species ==
- Trichochaeta nemoteloides Bigot, 1878
- Trichochaeta recedens (Walker, 1861)
- Trichochaeta scapularis (Walker, 1861)
