= Haplofijia =

Scientific classification
- Kingdom: Animalia
- Phylum: Arthropoda
- Clade: Pancrustacea
- Class: Insecta
- Order: Diptera
- Family: Stratiomyidae
- Subfamily: Pachygastrinae
- Genus: Haplofijia; Bezzi, 1928

Type species
- Haplofijia simplex Bezzi, 1928

Genus of flies

Haplofijia is a genus of flies in the family Stratiomyidae.

== Distribution ==
Fiji.

== Species ==
- Haplofijia simplex Bezzi, 1928
