= Alliophleps =

Scientific classification
- Kingdom: Animalia
- Phylum: Arthropoda
- Class: Insecta
- Order: Diptera
- Family: Stratiomyidae
- Subfamily: Pachygastrinae
- Genus: Alliophleps; Becker, 1908

Type species
- Alliophleps elliptica Becker, 1908

Genus of flies

Alliophleps is a genus of flies in the family Stratiomyidae.

== Species ==
- Alliophleps elliptica Becker, 1908
