= Hexacraspis =

Scientific classification
- Kingdom: Animalia
- Phylum: Arthropoda
- Class: Insecta
- Order: Diptera
- Family: Stratiomyidae
- Subfamily: Pachygastrinae
- Genus: Hexacraspis; Enderlein, 1914

Type species
- Diphysa sexspinosa Macquart, 1846

Genus of flies

Hexacraspis is a genus of flies in the family Stratiomyidae.

== Distribution ==
South Africa.

== Species ==
- Hexacraspis sexspinosa Macquart, 1846
