= Dochmiocera =

Scientific classification
- Kingdom: Animalia
- Phylum: Arthropoda
- Clade: Pancrustacea
- Class: Insecta
- Order: Diptera
- Family: Stratiomyidae
- Subfamily: Pachygastrinae
- Genus: Dochmiocera; Hardy, 1922

Type species
- Dochmiocera aurilineata Hardy, 1922

Genus of flies

Dochmiocera is a genus of flies in the family Stratiomyidae.

== Distribution ==
Australia.

== Species ==
- Dochmiocera aurilineata Hardy, 1922
