= Isomerocera =

Scientific classification
- Kingdom: Animalia
- Phylum: Arthropoda
- Class: Insecta
- Order: Diptera
- Family: Stratiomyidae
- Subfamily: Pachygastrinae
- Genus: Isomerocera; Enderlein, 1914

Type species
- Diphysa maculiventris Macquart, 1850

Genus of flies

Isomerocera is a genus of flies in the family Stratiomyidae.

== Species ==
- Isomerocera heteraspis James, 1949
- Isomerocera quadrilineata (Fabricius, 1787)
