= Parevaza =

Scientific classification
- Kingdom: Animalia
- Phylum: Arthropoda
- Class: Insecta
- Order: Diptera
- Family: Stratiomyidae
- Subfamily: Pachygastrinae
- Genus: Parevaza; James, 1978

Type species
- Parevaza longa James, 1978

Genus of flies

Parevaza is a genus of flies in the family Stratiomyidae.

== Distribution ==
New Guinea.

== Species ==
- Parevaza longa James, 1978
