= Mycterocera =

Scientific classification
- Kingdom: Animalia
- Phylum: Arthropoda
- Class: Insecta
- Order: Diptera
- Family: Stratiomyidae
- Subfamily: Pachygastrinae
- Genus: Mycterocera; James, 1967

Type species
- Mycterocera contigua James, 1967

Genus of flies

Mycterocera is a genus of flies in the family Stratiomyidae.

== Distribution ==
Argentina.

== Species ==
- Mycterocera contigua James, 1967
