= Obrapa =

Scientific classification
- Kingdom: Animalia
- Phylum: Arthropoda
- Class: Insecta
- Order: Diptera
- Family: Stratiomyidae
- Subfamily: Pachygastrinae
- Genus: Obrapa; Walker, 1858

Type species
- Obrapa celyphoides Walker, 1858

Genus of flies

Obrapa is a genus of flies in the family Stratiomyidae.

== Species ==
- Obrapa celyphoides Walker, 1858
- Obrapa leucostigma Bezzi, 1928
- Obrapa perilampoides Walker, 1858
