= Acyrocerops =

Scientific classification
- Kingdom: Animalia
- Phylum: Arthropoda
- Clade: Pancrustacea
- Class: Insecta
- Order: Diptera
- Family: Stratiomyidae
- Subfamily: Pachygastrinae
- Genus: Acyrocerops; James, 1978

Type species
- Acyrocerops furcifera James, 1978

Genus of flies

Acyrocerops is a genus of flies in the family Stratiomyidae.

== Distribution ==
New Guinea.

== Species ==
- Acyrocerops furcifera James, 1978
