= Panacridops =

Scientific classification
- Kingdom: Animalia
- Phylum: Arthropoda
- Class: Insecta
- Order: Diptera
- Family: Stratiomyidae
- Subfamily: Pachygastrinae
- Genus: Panacridops; Woodley, 1980

Type species
- Panacridops varians James & Woodley, 1980

Genus of flies

Panacridops is a genus of flies in the family Stratiomyidae.

== Distribution ==
Panama.

== Species ==
- Panacridops varians James & Woodley, 1980
