= Pseudomeristomerinx =

Scientific classification
- Kingdom: Animalia
- Phylum: Arthropoda
- Class: Insecta
- Order: Diptera
- Family: Stratiomyidae
- Subfamily: Pachygastrinae
- Genus: Pseudomeristomerinx; Hollis, 1963

Type species
- Pseudomeristomerinx nigricornis Hollis, 1963

Genus of flies

Pseudomeristomerinx is a genus of flies in the family Stratiomyidae.

== Species ==
- Pseudomeristomerinx flavimarginis Yang, Zhang & Li, 2014
- Pseudomeristomerinx nigricornis Hollis, 1963
- Pseudomeristomerinx nigromaculatus Yang, Zhang & Li, 2014
- Pseudomeristomerinx nigroscutellus Yang, Zhang & Li, 2014
