= Rosaphula =

Scientific classification
- Kingdom: Animalia
- Phylum: Arthropoda
- Class: Insecta
- Order: Diptera
- Family: Stratiomyidae
- Subfamily: Pachygastrinae
- Genus: Rosaphula; Frey, 1934

Type species
- Rosaphula handschini Frey, 1934

Genus of flies

Rosaphula is a genus of flies in the family Stratiomyidae.

== Species ==
- Rosaphula handschini Frey, 1934
