= Lonchegaster =

Scientific classification
- Kingdom: Animalia
- Phylum: Arthropoda
- Clade: Pancrustacea
- Class: Insecta
- Order: Diptera
- Family: Stratiomyidae
- Subfamily: Pachygastrinae
- Genus: Lonchegaster; White, 1914

Type species
- Lonchegaster armata White, 1914

Synonyms
- Lonchaegaster Malloch, 1928

Genus of flies

Lonchegaster is a genus of flies in the family Stratiomyidae.

== Distribution ==
Australia.

== Species ==
- Lonchegaster armata White, 1914
- Lonchegaster decumbens Hardy, 1933
