= Sphaerofijia =

Scientific classification
- Kingdom: Animalia
- Phylum: Arthropoda
- Clade: Pancrustacea
- Class: Insecta
- Order: Diptera
- Family: Stratiomyidae
- Subfamily: Pachygastrinae
- Genus: Sphaerofijia; Bezzi, 1928

Type species
- Sphaerofijia evazaeformis Bezzi, 1928

Genus of flies

Sphaerofijia is a genus of flies in the family Stratiomyidae.

== Species ==
- Sphaerofijia evazaeformis Bezzi, 1928
