= Kolomania =

Scientific classification
- Kingdom: Animalia
- Phylum: Arthropoda
- Class: Insecta
- Order: Diptera
- Family: Stratiomyidae
- Subfamily: Pachygastrinae
- Genus: Kolomania; Pleske, 1924

Type species
- Artemita pilosa Pleske, 1922

Synonyms
- Acanthinoides Ôuchi, 1940; Ouchimyia Nagatomi & Miyatake, 1965

Genus of flies

Kolomania is a genus of flies in the family Stratiomyidae.

== Species ==
- Kolomania albopilosa (Nagatomi, 1975)
- Kolomania nipponensis (Ôuchi, 1940)
- Kolomania pilosa (Pleske, 1922)
