= Pachyberis =

Scientific classification
- Kingdom: Animalia
- Phylum: Arthropoda
- Class: Insecta
- Order: Diptera
- Family: Stratiomyidae
- Subfamily: Pachygastrinae
- Genus: Pachyberis; James, 1975

Type species
- Pachyberis stigmaticalis James, 1975

Genus of flies

Pachyberis is a genus of flies in the family Stratiomyidae.

== Distribution ==
Madagascar.

== Species ==
- Pachyberis stigmaticalis James, 1975
