= Pedinocerops =

Scientific classification
- Kingdom: Animalia
- Phylum: Arthropoda
- Class: Insecta
- Order: Diptera
- Family: Stratiomyidae
- Subfamily: Pachygastrinae
- Genus: Pedinocerops; James, 1980

Type species
- Pedinocerops robusta James, 1980

Genus of flies

Pedinocerops is a genus of flies in the family Stratiomyidae.

== Distribution ==
Papua New Guinea.

== Species ==
- Pedinocerops ornatifrons (Hollis, 1963)
- Pedinocerops pendleburyi (Hollis, 1963)
- Pedinocerops radians (Walker, 1857)
- Pedinocerops robusta James, 1980
