= Anomalacanthimyia =

Scientific classification
- Kingdom: Animalia
- Phylum: Arthropoda
- Class: Insecta
- Order: Diptera
- Family: Stratiomyidae
- Subfamily: Pachygastrinae
- Genus: Anomalacanthimyia; Woodley, 2001

Type species
- Anomalacanthimyia divaricata James, 1978

Synonyms
- Anomalacantha (James, 1978)

Genus of flies

Anomalacanthimyia is a genus of flies in the family Stratiomyidae.

== Species ==
- Anomalacanthimyia divaricata (James, 1978)
- Anomalacanthimyia pedunculata (James, 1978)
