= Neochauna =

Scientific classification
- Kingdom: Animalia
- Phylum: Arthropoda
- Class: Insecta
- Order: Diptera
- Family: Stratiomyidae
- Subfamily: Pachygastrinae
- Genus: Neochauna; Williston, 1896

Type species
- Chauna variabilis Loew, 1847

Genus of flies

Neochauna is a genus of flies in the family Stratiomyidae.

== Distribution ==
Cuba.

== Species ==
- Neochauna variabilis (Loew, 1847)
