= Saruga (fly) =

Scientific classification
- Kingdom: Animalia
- Phylum: Arthropoda
- Class: Insecta
- Order: Diptera
- Family: Stratiomyidae
- Subfamily: Pachygastrinae
- Genus: Saruga; Walker, 1860

Type species
- Saruga conifera Walker, 1859

Synonyms
- Camelomyia James, 1980

Genus of flies

Saruga is a genus of flies in the family Stratiomyidae.

== Species ==
- Saruga conifera Walker, 1859
- Saruga esenini Krivosheina, 1993
