= Karl Grünberg (entomologist) =

German entomologist

Karl Grünberg (died 1921, in Rostock) was a German entomologist specialising in Lepidoptera.

Karl Grünberg was a professor at the University of Rostock. He wrote the Palearctic Notodontidae section of Adalbert Seitz's Die Gross-Schmetterlinge der Erde and named several African butterflies.

== Works ==
Partial list

- Grunberg, K. 1907 Zwei neue Hesperiiden aus Deutsch-Ostafrika. (Lep.). Deutsche Entomologische Zeitschrift 1907:577-578.
- Grunberg, K. 1908 Neue Lepidopteren aus Uganda. Sitzungsberichte der Gesellschaft Naturforschender Freunde zu Berlin 1908:50-62.
- Grunberg, K. 1910 Zur Kenntnis der Lepidopteren-Fauna der Sesse-Innseln im Victoria-Nyanza. Sitzungsberichte der Gesellschaft Naturforschender Freunde zu Berlin 1910:146-181.
- Grunberg, K. 1910 Neue westafrikanische Lepidopteren. Gesammelt von Herrn Gunter Tessman in Sud-Kamerun und Spanisch-Guinea (Uellegebiet). Sitzungsberichte der Gesellschaft Naturforschender Freunde zu Berlin 1910:469-480.
- Grunberg, K. 1910 Lepidoptera. Denkschriften der Medizinisch-Naturwissenschaftlichen Gesellschaft zu Jena 16:91-146.
- Grunberg, K. 1910 Eine Lepidopteren-Ausbeuk vom Kiwu-See. Societas Entomologica 24:145-148.
- Grunberg, K. 1912 Rhopalocera in Wissenschaftliche Ergebnisse der Deutschen Zentral-Afrika-Expedition 1907-1908. 3(Zoology 1):505-560.
