= Johannes C. H. de Meijere =

Dutch zoologist and entomologist

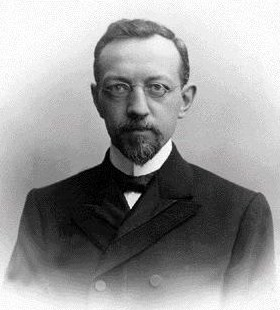
J.C.H. de Meijere

Johannes Cornelis Hendrik de Meijere (1 April 1866, Deventer – 6 November 1947) was a Dutch zoologist and entomologist who specialised in Diptera and Coleoptera.

Prof. dr. Johannes Cornelis Hendrik de Meijere was Rector Magnificus at the University of Amsterdam.

== Works ==
- Over de haren der zoogdieren: in 't bijzonder over hunne wijze van rangschikking. Leiden, 1933 (proefschrift).
- [co-auteur] Nieuwe naamlijst van Nederlandsche Diptera. 's-Gravenhage, 1898.
- Die Echinoidea der Siboga-Expedition. Leiden, 1904.
- Over het belang van academisch onderwijs in de entomologie. Amsterdam, 1906.
- Studien über sudostasiatische Dipteren. 16 delen. 's-Gravenhage, [1907–1924].
- De studie der insecten-biologie. Haarlem, 1908.
- 1908, Studien über südostasiatische Dipteren, Tijdschrift voor Entomologie, 51, 105-180
- 1908, Zwei neue Strepsiptera aus Java, Tijdschrift voor Entomologie, 51 185-190
- 1908, Studien über südostasiatischen Dipteren. III, Tijdschrift voor Entomologie, 51, 191-332
- Veranderlijkheid in eenheid. Amsterdam, 1929 (Rede 297e herdenking stichtingsdag Universiteit van Amsterdam).
- Verslag van de lotgevallen der Universiteit van Amsterdam gedurende den cursus 1928–1929. Amsterdam, 1929 (Rede bij de overdracht van het rectoraat op den 16en September 1929).
- Inleiding tot de kennis van de Nederlansche tweevleugelige insecten (Diptera). Zutphen, 1944.
