= Kálmán Kertész =

Hungarian entomologist (1867–1922)

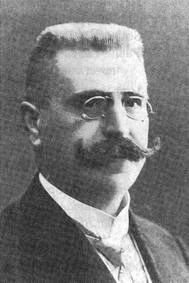
- Born: 2 January 1867; Prešov, Sáros County
- Died: 28 December 1922 (aged 55); Budapest
- Scientific career
- Fields: entomology
- Workplaces: Hungarian National Museum

Kálmán Kertész (2 January 1867 Prešov, Sáros County – 28 December 1922 Budapest) was a Hungarian entomologist mainly interested in Diptera.

He was the director of the Zoological Department of the Hungarian National Museum in Budapest.

Kertész world catalogues of the Diptera families Tabanidae and Pipunculidae were published in journals in 1900 and 1901, then between 1903 and 1907 he edited the whole Diptera catalogue of the Palaearctic Region and issued it in Budapest. This catalogue was together with Mario Bezzi, Paul Stein (1852–1921) and Theodor Becker as his co-authors. He worked on the world catalogue of Diptera which he planned to be 10 volumes and wrote alone. The first two volumes were issued in 1902 with the support of the Hungarian National Museum. The following 5 volumes were printed at his own cost in Szeged.

== Works ==
- Catalogus Tabanidarum orbis terrarum universi. Budapest, 1900
- Catalogus Pipunculidarum usque ad finem anni 1900 descriptorum. Budapest, 1901
- Orthorrhapha Nematocera. in: Katalog der paläarktischen Dipteren, Budapest, 1903.
- Catalogus Dipterorum hucusque descriptorum. I-VII. Budapestini, G. Engelmann (1902–1910)

== Sources ==
- Evenhuis, N. L. 1997: Litteratura taxonomica dipterorum (1758–1930). Volume 1 *(A-K); Volume 2 (L-Z). – Leiden, Backhuys Publishers 1; 2 VII+1-426; 427–871
- Cresson, E. T. jr. 1923: [Kertesz, K.] – Ent. News 34(4)
