= Erwin Lindner =

German entomologist (1888–1988)

Erwin Lindner (7 April 1888 – 30 November 1988) was a German entomologist mainly interested in Diptera.

He was born in Böglins, Memmingen, and died in Stuttgart, at age 100 years.

In 1913, Erwin Lindner joined the State Museum of Natural History Stuttgart and was head of the Department of Entomology there until 1953. He edited Die Fliegen der paläarktischen Region (the Flies of the Palaearctic Region), a twelve-volume seminal work on the systematics and anatomy of the flies of the Palearctic realm. Lindner, a passionate collector, participated in several expeditions and traveled to Dalmatia, the Gran Chaco, Anatolia, Liguria, East Africa, Italy, Spain and the regions of the Alps.
