= Ruba =

Ruba may refer to:

== People ==
- Máel Ruba (642–722), Irish saint
- Ruba Ghazal (born 1977), Canadian politician
- Ruba Katrib, American curator
- Ruba Marshood, CEO of Indiana literacy nonprofit Indy Reads
- Ruba Nadda (born 1972), Canadian film director

== Places ==
- Ruba, Belarus
- Ruba Parish, Latvia

== Science ==
- Rubredoxin A, protein component of photosynthesis
- Ruba (fly), a genus of insects in the family Stratiomyidae

== Other uses ==
- Ullucus, a genus of plants grown mainly for its use as a root vegetable
