= Euryneura =

Scientific classification
- Kingdom: Animalia
- Phylum: Arthropoda
- Clade: Pancrustacea
- Class: Insecta
- Order: Diptera
- Family: Stratiomyidae
- Subfamily: Clitellariinae
- Genus: Euryneura; Schiner, 1867

Type species
- Stratiomys fascipennis Fabricius, 1805

Genus of flies

Euryneura is a genus of soldier flies in the family Stratiomyidae. There are at least 8 described species of Euryneura.

== Species ==
- Dieuryneura stigma (Giglio-Tos, 1891)
- Euryneura elegans Williston, 1888
- Euryneura fascipennis (Fabricius, 1805)
- Euryneura kerteszi Iide, 1968
- Euryneura mexicana Kertész, 1908
- Euryneura peruana Kertész, 1908
- Euryneura propinqua Schiner, 1868
- Euryneura pygmaea (Bellardi, 1862)
- Euryneura robusta Kertész, 1908
