= Euryneura propinqua =

Scientific classification
- Kingdom: Animalia
- Phylum: Arthropoda
- Class: Insecta
- Order: Diptera
- Family: Stratiomyidae
- Subfamily: Clitellariinae
- Genus: Euryneura
- Species: E. propinqua

Binomial name
- Euryneura propinqua Schiner, 1867

Species of fly

Euryneura propinqua is a species of soldier flies in the family Stratiomyidae.

== Distribution ==
United States, Colombia, Mexico, Venezuela.
