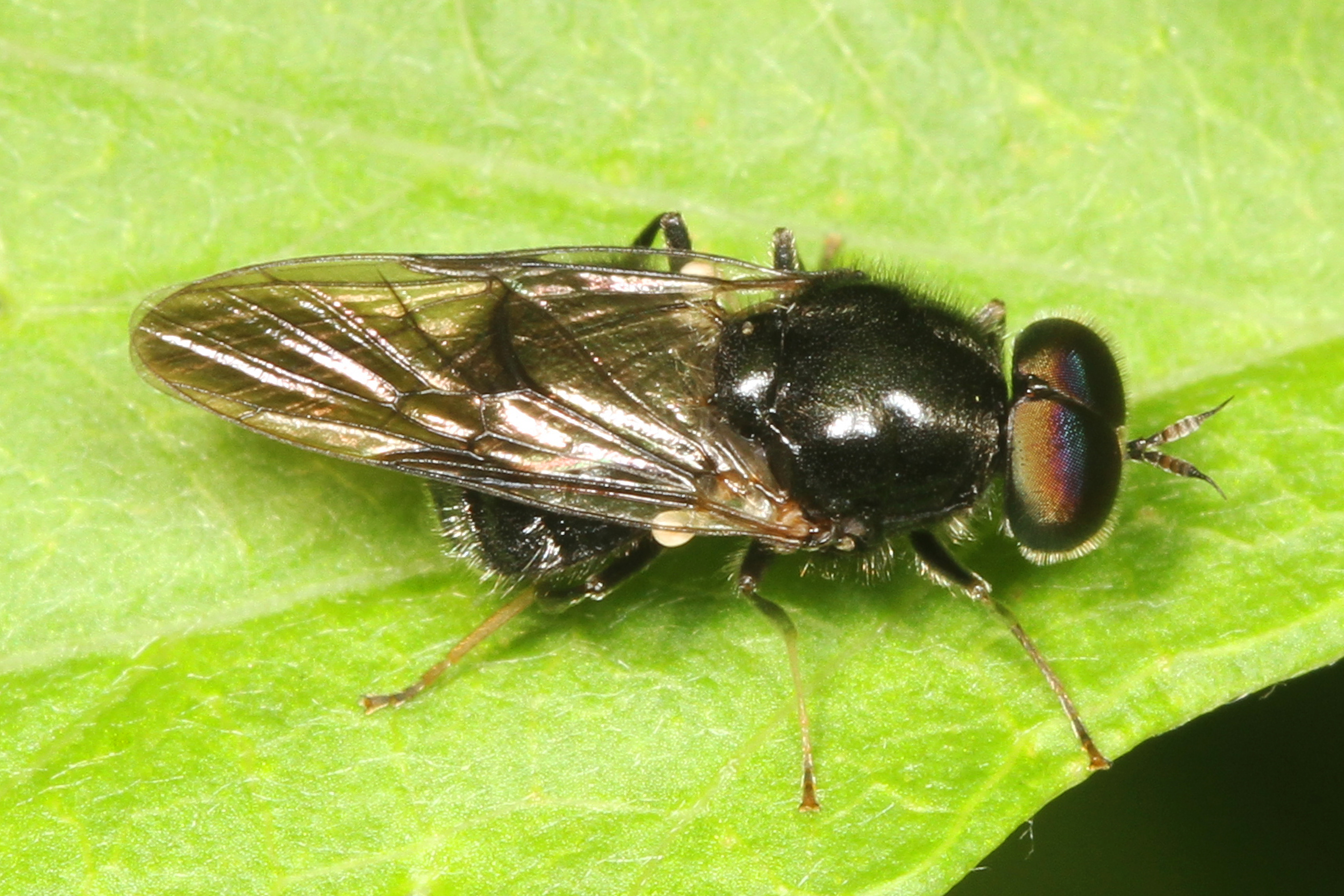

Scientific classification
- Kingdom: Animalia
- Phylum: Arthropoda
- Class: Insecta
- Order: Diptera
- Family: Stratiomyidae
- Subfamily: Clitellariinae
- Genus: Adoxomyia
- Species: A. subulata

Binomial name
- Adoxomyia subulata (Loew, 1866)

Synonyms
- Clitellaria subulata Loew, 1866

= Adoxomyia subulata =

Species of fly

Adoxomyia subulata is a species of soldier fly in the family Stratiomyidae. It is located in the United States.
