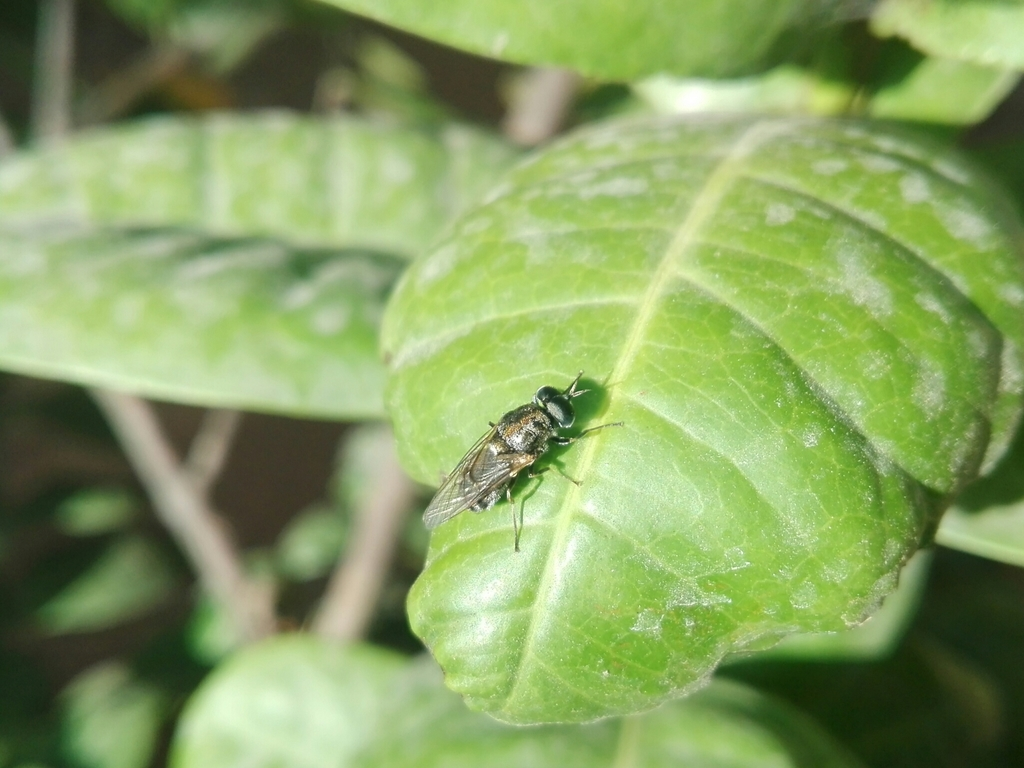

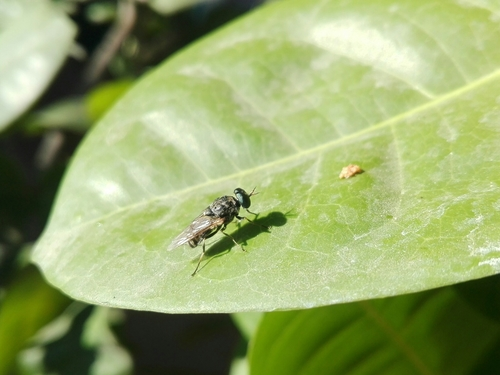
- Adult on Ixora coccinea in Trincomalee, Sri Lanka

Scientific classification
- Kingdom: Animalia
- Phylum: Arthropoda
- Class: Insecta
- Order: Diptera
- Family: Stratiomyidae
- Subfamily: Clitellariinae
- Genus: Adoxomyia
- Species: A. heminopla

Binomial name
- Adoxomyia heminopla Wiedemann, 1819

Synonyms
- Adoxomyia hemienopla Hauser & Rozkosny, 1999; Clitellaria heminopla Wiedemann, 1819

= Adoxomyia heminopla =

Species of soldier fly

Adoxomyia heminopla is a species of soldier fly in the family Stratiomyidae. It is found in India, Sri Lanka and Java.

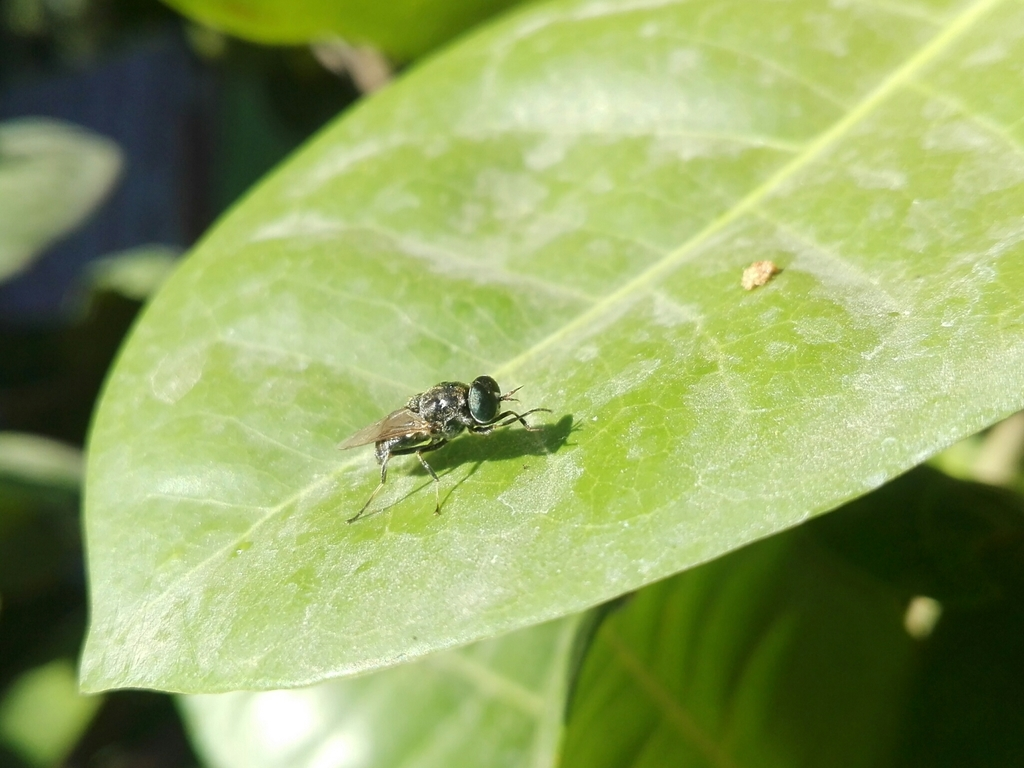
Adult Adoxomyia heminopla on an Ixora coccinea in Trincomalee, Sri Lanka
