= Cyphomyia erecta =

Scientific classification
- Kingdom: Animalia
- Phylum: Arthropoda
- Class: Insecta
- Order: Diptera
- Family: Stratiomyidae
- Subfamily: Clitellariinae
- Genus: Cyphomyia
- Species: C. erecta

Binomial name
- Cyphomyia erecta McFadden, 1969

Species of fly

Cyphomyia erecta is a species of soldier fly in the family Stratiomyidae.

== Distribution ==
United States, Mexico.
