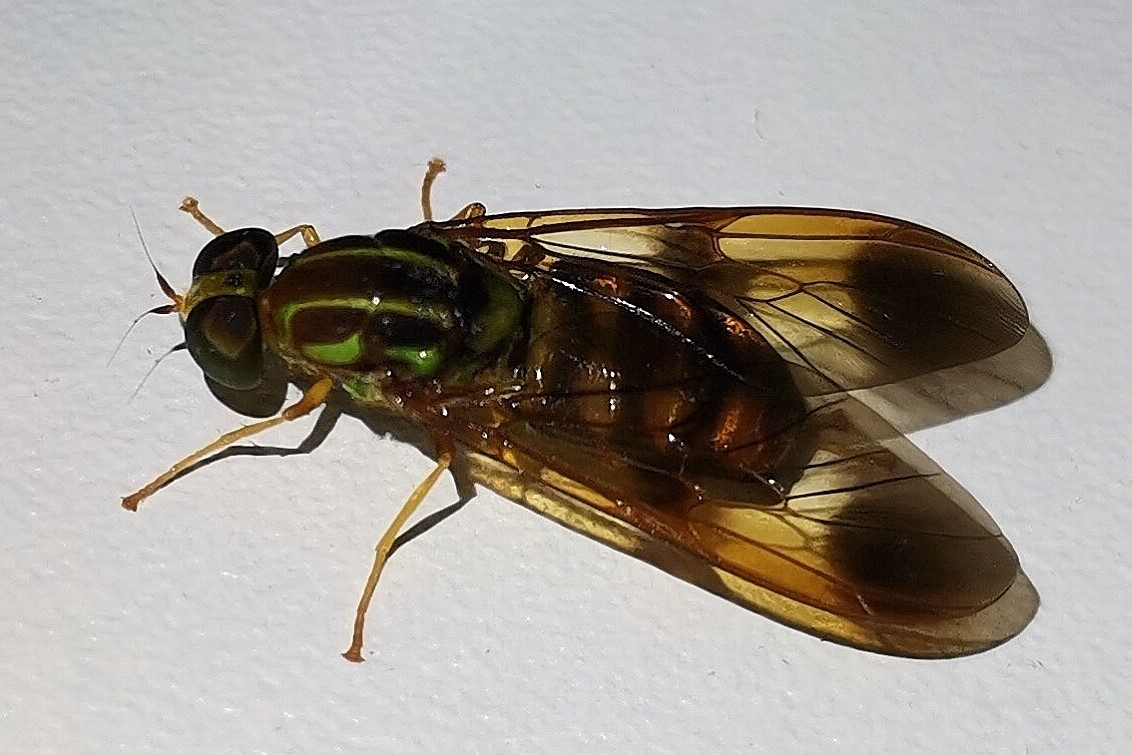
- Chrysochlorina currani

Scientific classification
- Kingdom: Animalia
- Phylum: Arthropoda
- Clade: Pancrustacea
- Class: Insecta
- Order: Diptera
- Family: Stratiomyidae
- Subfamily: Chrysochlorininae
- Genus: Chrysochlorina; James, 1939

Type species
- Sargus vespertilio Fabricius, 1805

= Chrysochlorina =

Genus of flies

Chrysochlorina is a genus of flies in the family Stratiomyidae.

== Species ==
- Chrysochlorina albipes James, 1939
- Chrysochlorina bezziana Iide, 1966
- Chrysochlorina breviseta (Walker, 1854)
- Chrysochlorina castanea (Macquart, 1838)
- Chrysochlorina costalimai Iide, 1966
- Chrysochlorina currani Iide, 1966
- Chrysochlorina echemon (Walker, 1849)
- Chrysochlorina elegans (Perty, 1833)
- Chrysochlorina fasciata (Thomson, 1869)
- Chrysochlorina femoralis (Curran, 1929)
- Chrysochlorina flavescens (James, 1937)
- Chrysochlorina frosti James, 1939
- Chrysochlorina haterius (Walker, 1849)
- Chrysochlorina incompleta (Curran, 1929)
- Chrysochlorina longiseta (Walker, 1854)
- Chrysochlorina maculiventris (Rondani, 1850)
- Chrysochlorina pluricolor (Bigot, 1879)
- Chrysochlorina pulchra (Williston, 1900)
- Chrysochlorina quadrilineata (Bigot, 1887)
- Chrysochlorina similis (Macquart, 1855)
- Chrysochlorina varia (Curran, 1929)
- Chrysochlorina vespertilio (Fabricius, 1805)
