= Rubredoxin—NAD(+) reductase =

Enzyme that catalyzes the chemical reaction

rubredoxin-NAD^{+} reductase

Identifiers
- EC no.: 1.18.1.1
- CAS no.: 9032-27-3

Databases
- BRENDA: enzyme data
- ExPASy: NiceZyme view
- KEGG: enzyme entry
- MetaCyc: metabolic pathway
- Rhea: reactions
- PDB structures: RCSB PDB PDBe PDBsum
- Gene Ontology: AmiGO / QuickGO
Search
- PMC: articles
- PubMed: articles
- NCBI: proteins

In enzymology, a rubredoxin-NAD^{+} reductase (EC 1.18.1.1) is an enzyme that catalyzes the chemical reaction.

2 reduced rubredoxin + NAD^{+} + H^{+} $\rightleftharpoons$ 2 oxidized rubredoxin + NADH

The 3 substrates of this enzyme are reduced rubredoxin, NAD^{+}, and H^{+}, whereas its two products are oxidized rubredoxin and NADH.

This enzyme belongs to the family of oxidoreductases, specifically those acting on iron-sulfur proteins as donor with NAD^{+} or NADP^{+} as acceptor. The systematic name of this enzyme class is rubredoxin:NAD^{+} oxidoreductase. Other names in common use include rubredoxin reductase, rubredoxin-nicotinamide adenine dinucleotide reductase, dihydronicotinamide adenine dinucleotide-rubredoxin reductase, reduced nicotinamide adenine dinucleotide-rubredoxin reductase, NADH-rubredoxin reductase, rubredoxin-NAD reductase, NADH: rubredoxin oxidoreductase, DPNH-rubredoxin reductase, and NADH-rubredoxin oxidoreductase. This enzyme participates in fatty acid metabolism. It has 2 cofactors: FAD and Iron.

== Structural studies ==
As of late 2007, only one structure has been solved for this class of enzymes, with the PDB accession code PDB: 1BFY.

== See also ==
- Rubredoxin—NAD(P)(+) reductase
