= Adoxomyia rustica =

Scientific classification
- Kingdom: Animalia
- Phylum: Arthropoda
- Class: Insecta
- Order: Diptera
- Family: Stratiomyidae
- Subfamily: Clitellariinae
- Genus: Adoxomyia
- Species: A. rustica

Binomial name
- Adoxomyia rustica (Osten Sacken, 1877)

Synonyms
- Clitellaria rustica Osten Sacken, 1877

Species of fly

Adoxomyia rustica is a species of soldier flies in the family Stratiomyidae.
