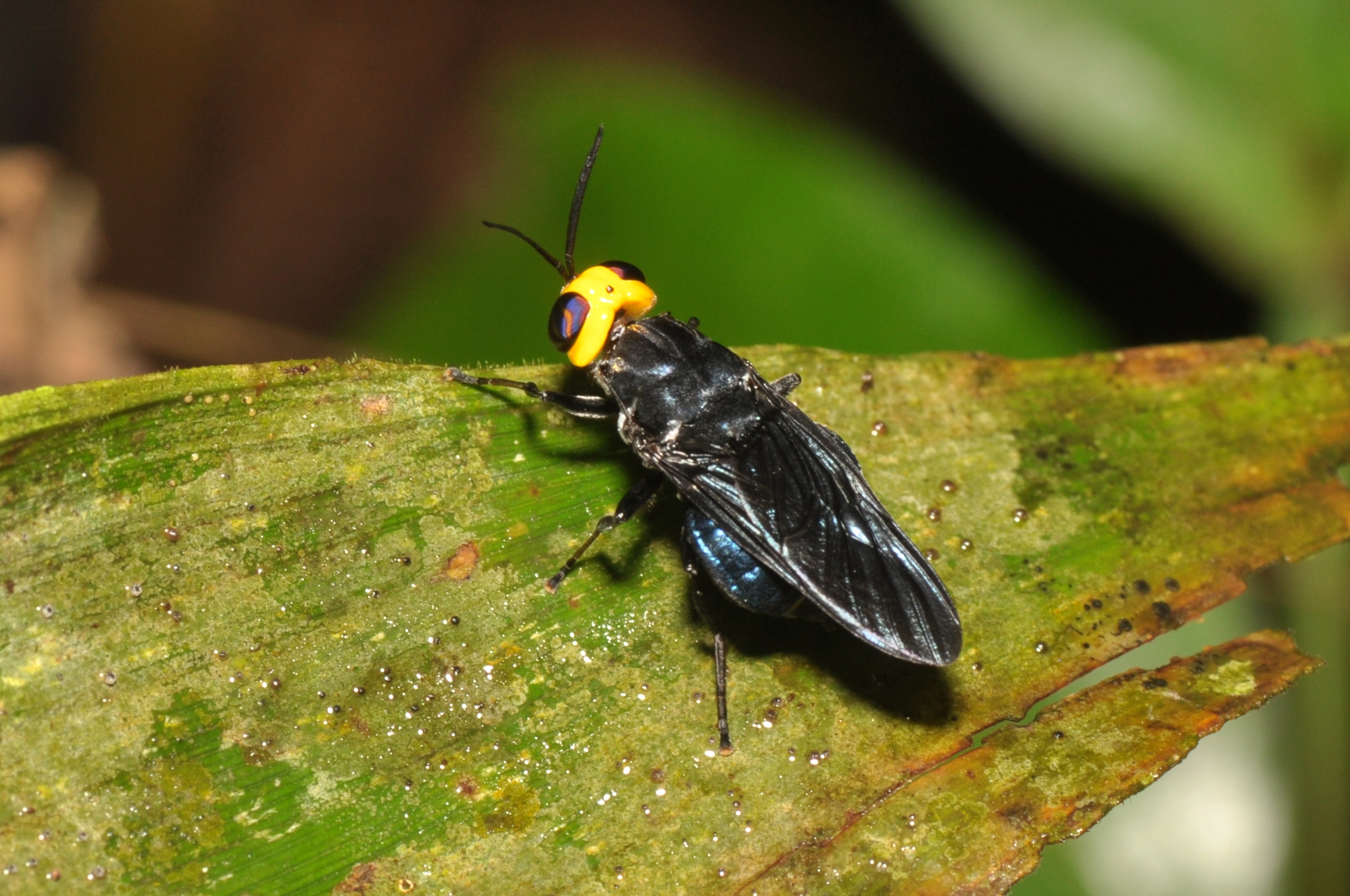
- Cyphomyia spp.

Scientific classification
- Kingdom: Animalia
- Phylum: Arthropoda
- Clade: Pancrustacea
- Class: Insecta
- Order: Diptera
- Family: Stratiomyidae
- Subfamily: Clitellariinae
- Genus: Cyphomyia; Wiedemann, 1819

Type species
- Cyphomyia auriflamma Wiedemann, 1819

Synonyms
- Cyphomia Róndani, 1863; Ciphomia Róndani, 1863; Cyphomya Róndani, 1863; Rondania Jaennicke, 1867; Neorondania Osten Sacken, 1878; Gyneuryparia Enderlein, 1914; Ciphomyia James, 1980; Cephomyia Mead, 1992

= Cyphomyia =

Genus of flies

Cyphomyia is a genus of flies in the subfamily Clitellariinae.

== Species ==
- Cyphomyia abana Curran, 1929
- Cyphomyia acuminata James, 1940
- Cyphomyia aczeli James, 1953
- Cyphomyia affinis Gerstaecker, 1857
- Cyphomyia albicaput (Walker, 1849)
- Cyphomyia albispina Enderlein, 1914
- Cyphomyia albitarsis (Fabricius, 1805)
- Cyphomyia albomaculata (Macquart, 1834)
- Cyphomyia albopilosa Yang, Zhang & Li, 2014
- Cyphomyia altifrons James, 1939
- Cyphomyia androgyna Osten Sacken, 1886
- Cyphomyia auriflamma Wiedemann, 1819
- Cyphomyia aurifrons Wiedemann, 1830
- Cyphomyia banksi James, 1937
- Cyphomyia baoruca Woodley, 2014
- Cyphomyia bicarinata Williston, 1900
- Cyphomyia brevis James, 1940
- Cyphomyia chalybea (Wiedemann, 1824)
- Cyphomyia chinensis Ôuchi, 1938
- Cyphomyia chrysodota Perty, 1833
- Cyphomyia claripennis Macquart, 1847
- Cyphomyia coprates (Walker, 1849)
- Cyphomyia curvispina Enderlein, 1914
- Cyphomyia cyanea (Fabricius, 1794)
- Cyphomyia dispar Schiner, 1868
- Cyphomyia dominicana James, 1967
- Cyphomyia ecuadoriensis Enderlein, 1914
- Cyphomyia erecta McFadden, 1969
- Cyphomyia erectispinis Lindner, 1935
- Cyphomyia fascipes Walker, 1854
- Cyphomyia fassli Lindner, 1949
- Cyphomyia ferruginea Enderlein, 1914
- Cyphomyia flaviceps (Walker, 1856)
- Cyphomyia flavimana Gerstaecker, 1857
- Cyphomyia flavipennis Enderlein, 1914
- Cyphomyia formosa James, 1940
- Cyphomyia geniculata Gerstaecker, 1857
- Cyphomyia golbachi James, 1953
- Cyphomyia gracilicornis Gerstaecker, 1857
- Cyphomyia helvipennis Enderlein, 1914
- Cyphomyia hybrida Gerstaecker, 1857
- Cyphomyia indica Brunetti, 1920
- Cyphomyia jamesi Lindner, 1949
- Cyphomyia lasiophthalma Williston, 1896
- Cyphomyia leucocephala Wiedemann, 1819
- Cyphomyia longicornis (Walker, 1857)
- Cyphomyia marginata Loew, 1866
- Cyphomyia marshalli Lindner, 1937
- Cyphomyia neivai James, 1940
- Cyphomyia nigripes Meijere, 1919
- Cyphomyia nigritarsis Enderlein, 1914
- Cyphomyia notabilis (Walker, 1856)
- Cyphomyia nubilipennis James, 1939
- Cyphomyia obscura (Jaennicke, 1867)
- Cyphomyia obscuripalpis Meijere, 1919
- Cyphomyia ochracea Giglio-Tos, 1891
- Cyphomyia orientalis Kertész, 1914
- Cyphomyia ornata Walker, 1850
- Cyphomyia picta Schiner, 1868
- Cyphomyia pilosissima Gerstaecker, 1857
- Cyphomyia planifrons James, 1939
- Cyphomyia pulchella Gerstaecker, 1857
- Cyphomyia regularis Curran, 1929
- Cyphomyia rohweri (Cockerell, 1916)
- Cyphomyia rubra Loew, 1866
- Cyphomyia scalaris Bigot, 1876
- Cyphomyia schwarzi James, 1940
- Cyphomyia shannoni James, 1939
- Cyphomyia simplex Walker, 1860
- Cyphomyia souzalopesi Iide, 1967
- Cyphomyia speciosa Lindner, 1951
- Cyphomyia sulcifrons Curran, 1929
- Cyphomyia tomentosa Gerstaecker, 1857
- Cyphomyia unicolor (Walker, 1854)
- Cyphomyia varipes Gerstaecker, 1857
- Cyphomyia verticalis Gerstaecker, 1857
- Cyphomyia violacea Macquart, 1855
- Cyphomyia whiteheadi Woodley, 1991
- Cyphomyia wiedemanni Gerstaecker, 1857
- Cyphomyia willistoni Enderlein, 1914
