= Cacosis =

Scientific classification
- Kingdom: Animalia
- Phylum: Arthropoda
- Clade: Pancrustacea
- Class: Insecta
- Order: Diptera
- Family: Stratiomyidae
- Subfamily: Chrysochlorininae
- Genus: Cacosis; Walker, 1851

Type species
- Sargus niger Wiedemann, 1819

Genus of flies

Cacosis is a genus of flies in the family Stratiomyidae.

== Species ==
- Cacosis grandis Schiner, 1868
- Cacosis niger (Wiedemann, 1819)
- †Cacosis sexannulata Meunier, 1910
