= Abavus =

Scientific classification
- Kingdom: Animalia
- Phylum: Arthropoda
- Clade: Pancrustacea
- Class: Insecta
- Order: Diptera
- Family: Stratiomyidae
- Subfamily: Clitellariinae
- Genus: Abavus; Enderlein, 1914

Type species
- Abavus priscus Enderlein, 1914

Genus of flies

Abavus is a genus of flies in the family Stratiomyidae.

== Species ==
- Abavus maculatus Lindner, 1933
- Abavus multisignatus Lindner, 1949
- Abavus priscus Enderlein, 1914
