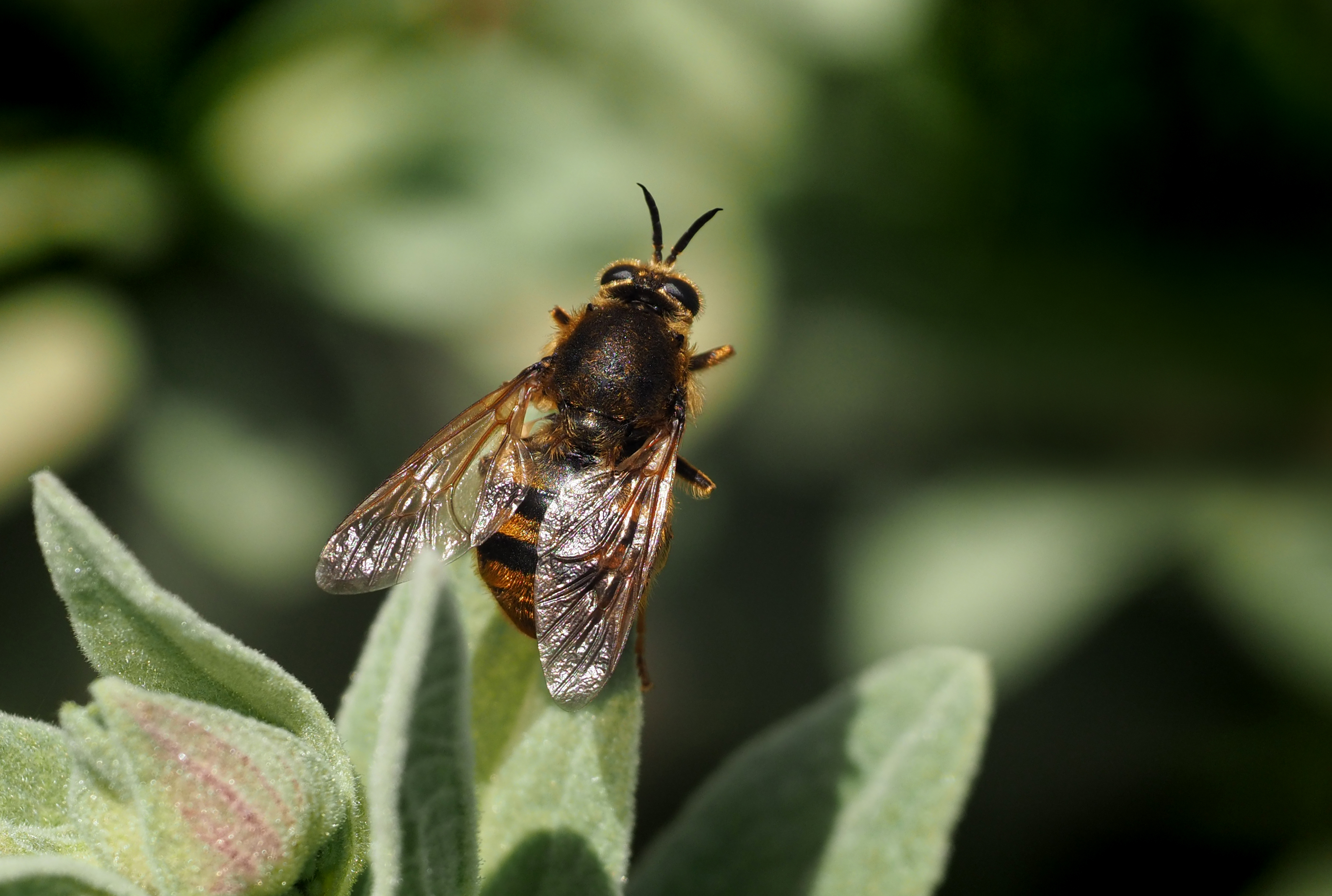
- Pycnomalla splendens

Scientific classification
- Kingdom: Animalia
- Phylum: Arthropoda
- Clade: Pancrustacea
- Class: Insecta
- Order: Diptera
- Family: Stratiomyidae
- Subfamily: Clitellariinae
- Genus: Pycnomalla; Gerstaecker, 1857

Type species
- Stratiomys splendens Fabricius, 1787

= Pycnomalla =

Genus of flies

Pycnomalla is a genus of flies in the family Stratiomyidae.

== Species ==
- Pycnomalla aterrima Sack, 1911
- Pycnomalla auriflua (Erichson, 1841)
- Pycnomalla splendens (Fabricius, 1787)
