= Octarthria =

Scientific classification
- Kingdom: Animalia
- Phylum: Arthropoda
- Clade: Pancrustacea
- Class: Insecta
- Order: Diptera
- Family: Stratiomyidae
- Subfamily: Clitellariinae
- Genus: Octarthria; Brauer, 1882

Type species
- Clitellaria aberrans Schiner, 1868

Synonyms
- Diapontiomyia Kertész, 1923; Ophiodesma White, 1916

Genus of flies

Octarthria is a genus of flies in the family Stratiomyidae.

== Species ==
- Octarthria aberrans (Schiner, 1868)
- Octarthria auricincta Kertész, 1923
- Octarthria brunnipennis (Fuller, 1934)
- Octarthria flavipalpis (Macquart, 1850)
- Octarthria innoda (Hardy, 1932)
- Octarthria minor (Fuller, 1934)
