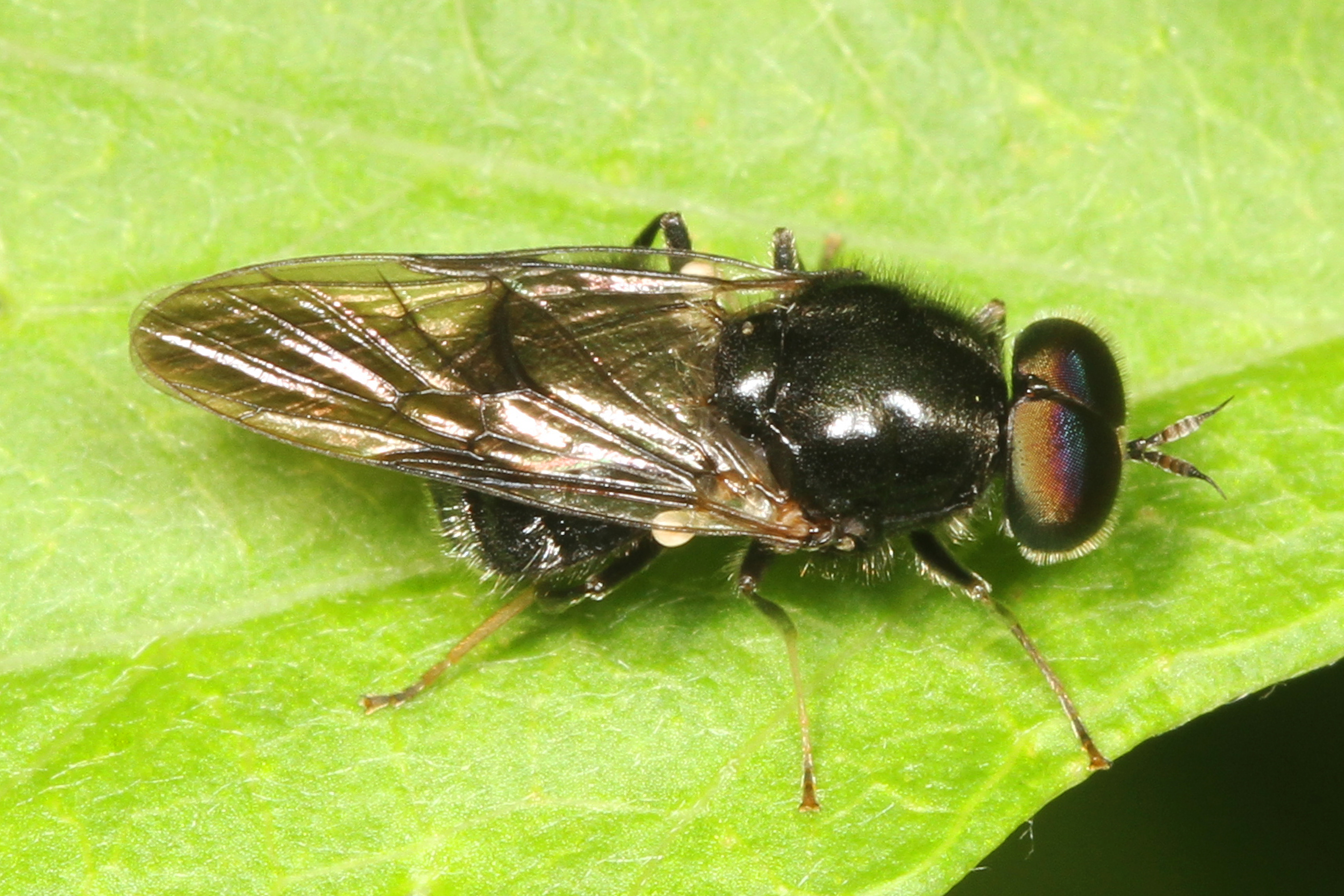
- Adoxomyia subulata
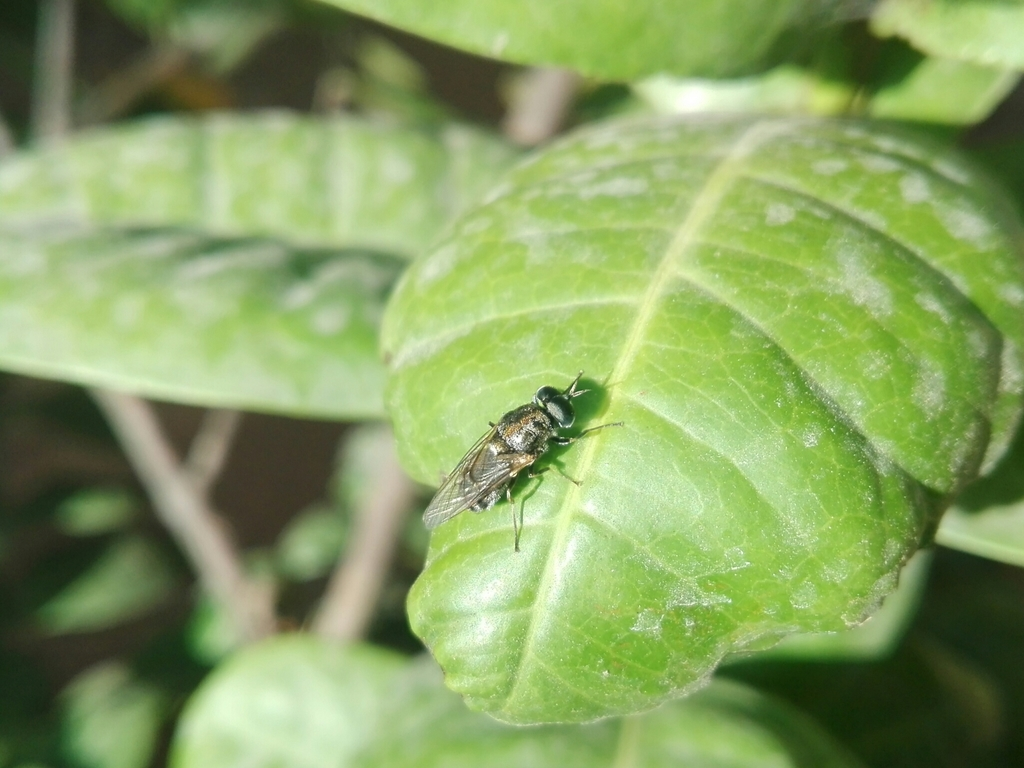
- Adoxomyia heminopla

Scientific classification
- Kingdom: Animalia
- Phylum: Arthropoda
- Clade: Pancrustacea
- Class: Insecta
- Order: Diptera
- Family: Stratiomyidae
- Subfamily: Clitellariinae
- Genus: Adoxomyia; Kertész, 1907

Type species
- Clitellaria dahlii Meigen, 1830

Synonyms
- Haplephippium Speiser, 1913; Euclitellaria Kertész, 1923; Mixoclitellaria Lindner, 1935; Adomyxia Kertész & Freidberg, 1978; Adoxomya Kertész & Freidberg, 1978

= Adoxomyia =

Genus of flies

Adoxomyia is a genus of soldier flies in the family Stratiomyidae.

== Species ==
- Adoxomyia alaschanica Pleske, 1925
- Adoxomyia albopilosa (Cresson, 1919)
- Adoxomyia appressa James, 1935
- Adoxomyia argentata (Williston, 1885)
- Adoxomyia argenteofasciata (Bezzi, 1906)
- Adoxomyia aureovittata (Bigot, 1879)
- Adoxomyia begreliensis Ustuner, 2012
- Adoxomyia bistriata (Brunetti, 1912)
- Adoxomyia brevispina (Kertész, 1923)
- Adoxomyia cinerascens (Loew, 1873)
- Adoxomyia claripennis James, 1935
- Adoxomyia colossula (Speiser, 1913)
- Adoxomyia dahlii (Meigen, 1830)
- Adoxomyia fenestrata (Macquart, 1846)
- Adoxomyia flauipes (Fabricius, 1798)
- Adoxomyia formosana (Kertész, 1923)
- Adoxomyia hasbenlii Üstüner, 2021
- Adoxomyia heminopla (Wiedemann, 1819)
- Adoxomyia hermonensis Lindner, 1975
- Adoxomyia hungshanensis Ôuchi, 1938
- Adoxomyia lata (Loew, 1872)
- Adoxomyia lindneri Dušek & Rozkošný, 1963
- Adoxomyia lugubris Pleske, 1925
- Adoxomyia maculipennis (Lindner, 1935)
- Adoxomyia marginata James, 1969
- Adoxomyia micheneri James, 1950
- Adoxomyia nigribarba James, 1943
- Adoxomyia nubifera (Loew, 1857)
- Adoxomyia obscuripennis (Loew, 1873)
- Adoxomyia palestinensis (Lindner, 1937)
- Adoxomyia pleskei Lindner, 1937
- Adoxomyia regularis James, 1969
- Adoxomyia ruficornis (Loew, 1873)
- Adoxomyia rustica (Osten Sacken, 1877)
- Adoxomyia sarudnyi (Pleske, 1903)
- Adoxomyia smirnovi Krivosheina, 2018
- Adoxomyia socotrae Hauser, 2002
- Adoxomyia sublugubris Krivosheina, 2018
- Adoxomyia subruficornis Krivosheina, 2017
- Adoxomyia subulata (Loew, 1866)
- Adoxomyia tenuicornis James, 1969
- Adoxomyia texana James, 1935
- Adoxomyia transcaucasica Nartshuk, 2004
- Adoxomyia variabilis Krivosheina, 2016
- Adoxomyia weyrauchi Lindner, 1951
