= Amphilecta =

Scientific classification
- Kingdom: Animalia
- Phylum: Arthropoda
- Clade: Pancrustacea
- Class: Insecta
- Order: Diptera
- Family: Stratiomyidae
- Subfamily: Clitellariinae
- Genus: Amphilecta; Brauer, 1882

Type species
- Amphilecta superba Brauer, 1882

Genus of flies

Amphilecta is a genus of flies in the family Stratiomyidae.

== Species ==
- Amphilecta superba Brauer, 1882
