= Platopsomyia =

Scientific classification
- Kingdom: Animalia
- Phylum: Arthropoda
- Clade: Pancrustacea
- Class: Insecta
- Order: Diptera
- Family: Stratiomyidae
- Subfamily: Clitellariinae
- Genus: Platopsomyia; James, 1937

Type species
- Platopsomyia flavida James, 1937

Genus of flies

Platopsomyia is a genus of flies in the family Stratiomyidae.

== Species ==
- Platopsomyia flavida James, 1937

== Distribution ==
It is found in Cuba.
