= Meringostylus =

Scientific classification
- Kingdom: Animalia
- Phylum: Arthropoda
- Clade: Pancrustacea
- Class: Insecta
- Order: Diptera
- Family: Stratiomyidae
- Subfamily: Clitellariinae
- Genus: Meringostylus; Kertész, 1908

Genus of flies

Meringostylus is a genus of flies in the family Stratiomyidae.

== Species ==
- Meringostylus chiquitanus Lindner, 1930
- Meringostylus schineri Kertész, 1908
