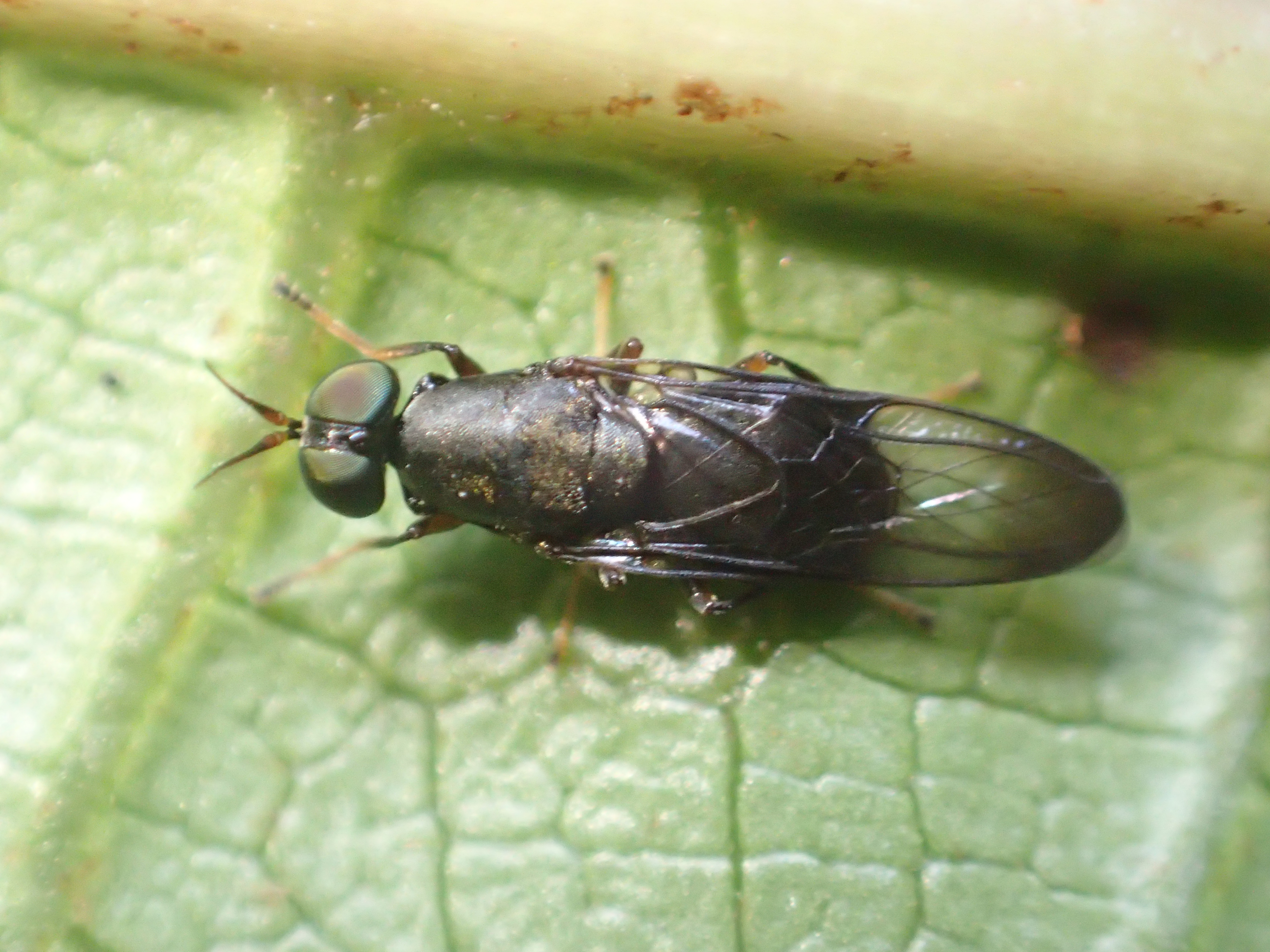
- Dysbiota peregrina

Scientific classification
- Kingdom: Animalia
- Phylum: Arthropoda
- Clade: Pancrustacea
- Class: Insecta
- Order: Diptera
- Family: Stratiomyidae
- Subfamily: Clitellariinae
- Genus: Dysbiota; Lindner, 1958

Type species
- Dysbiota parvula Lindner, 1958

= Dysbiota =

Genus of flies

Dysbiota is a genus of flies in the family Stratiomyidae.

== Species ==
- Dysbiota parvula Lindner, 1958
- Dysbiota peregrina (Hutton, 1901)
