= Chrysochlora =

Scientific classification
- Kingdom: Animalia
- Phylum: Arthropoda
- Clade: Pancrustacea
- Class: Insecta
- Order: Diptera
- Family: Stratiomyidae
- Subfamily: Chrysochlorininae
- Genus: Chrysochlora; Latreille, 1829

Type species
- Sargus amethystimus Fabricius, 1805

Synonyms
- Chrijsochlora Doleschall, 1856; Chrisochlora Macquart, 1835; Chrycochlora Williston, 1885; Chryscchlora Brauer, 1882; Chrysochloran Berthold, 1827

Genus of flies

Chrysochlora is a genus of flies in the family Stratiomyidae.

== Species ==
- Chrysochlora amethystina (Fabricius, 1805)
- Chrysochlora cooksoni Lindner, 1966
- Chrysochlora insularis Ricardo, 1929
- Chrysochlora luteipes Ricardo, 1929
