= Eudmeta =

Scientific classification
- Kingdom: Animalia
- Phylum: Arthropoda
- Clade: Pancrustacea
- Class: Insecta
- Order: Diptera
- Family: Stratiomyidae
- Subfamily: Clitellariinae
- Genus: Eudmeta; Wiedemann, 1830

Type species
- Hermetia marginata Fabricius, 1805

Synonyms
- Toxocera Macquart, 1850

Genus of flies

Eudmeta is a genus of flies in the family Stratiomyidae.

== Species ==
- Eudmeta brunnea Meijere, 1904
- Eudmeta coerulemaculata Yang, Wei & Yang, 2010
- Eudmeta diadematipennis Brunetti, 1923
- Eudmeta marginata (Fabricius, 1805)
