= Ampsalis =

Scientific classification
- Kingdom: Animalia
- Phylum: Arthropoda
- Clade: Pancrustacea
- Class: Insecta
- Order: Diptera
- Family: Stratiomyidae
- Subfamily: Clitellariinae
- Genus: Ampsalis; Walker, 1859

Type species
- Ampsalis geniata Walker, 1859

Synonyms
- Tracana Walker, 1859

Genus of flies

Ampsalis is a genus of flies in the family Stratiomyidae.

== Species ==
- Ampsalis dichromata James, 1975
- Ampsalis geniata Walker, 1859
- Ampsalis iterabilis Walker, 1859
- Ampsalis terminalis James, 1960
