= Lagenosoma =

Scientific classification
- Kingdom: Animalia
- Phylum: Arthropoda
- Clade: Pancrustacea
- Class: Insecta
- Order: Diptera
- Family: Stratiomyidae
- Subfamily: Clitellariinae
- Genus: Lagenosoma; Brauer, 1882

Type species
- Lagenosoma picta Brauer, 1882

Genus of flies

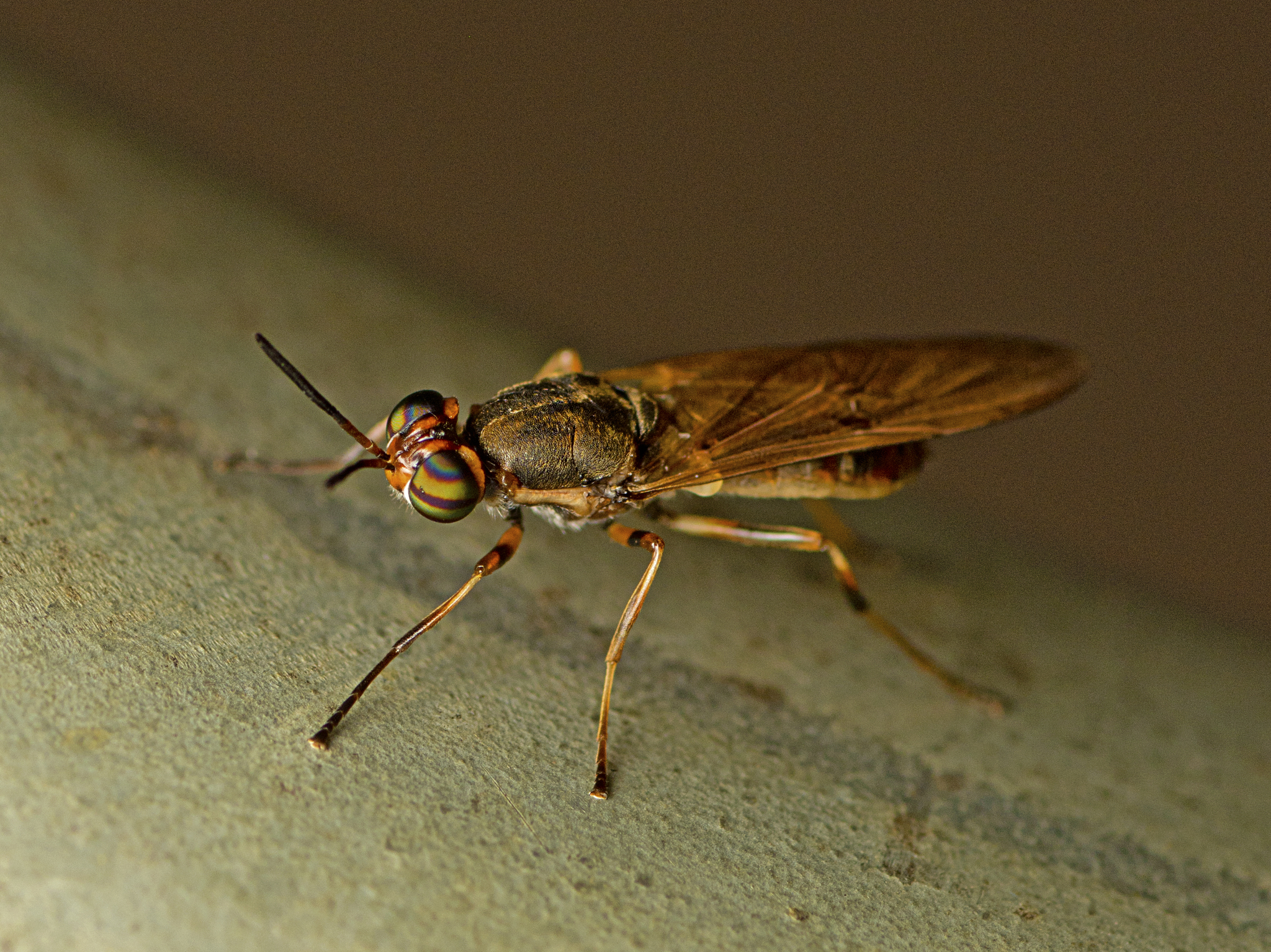
Lagenosoma dispar

Lagenosoma is a genus of flies in the family Stratiomyidae.

== Species ==
- Lagenosoma dispar Brauer, 1882
- Lagenosoma picta Brauer, 1882
- Lagenosoma propinqua Brauer, 1882
