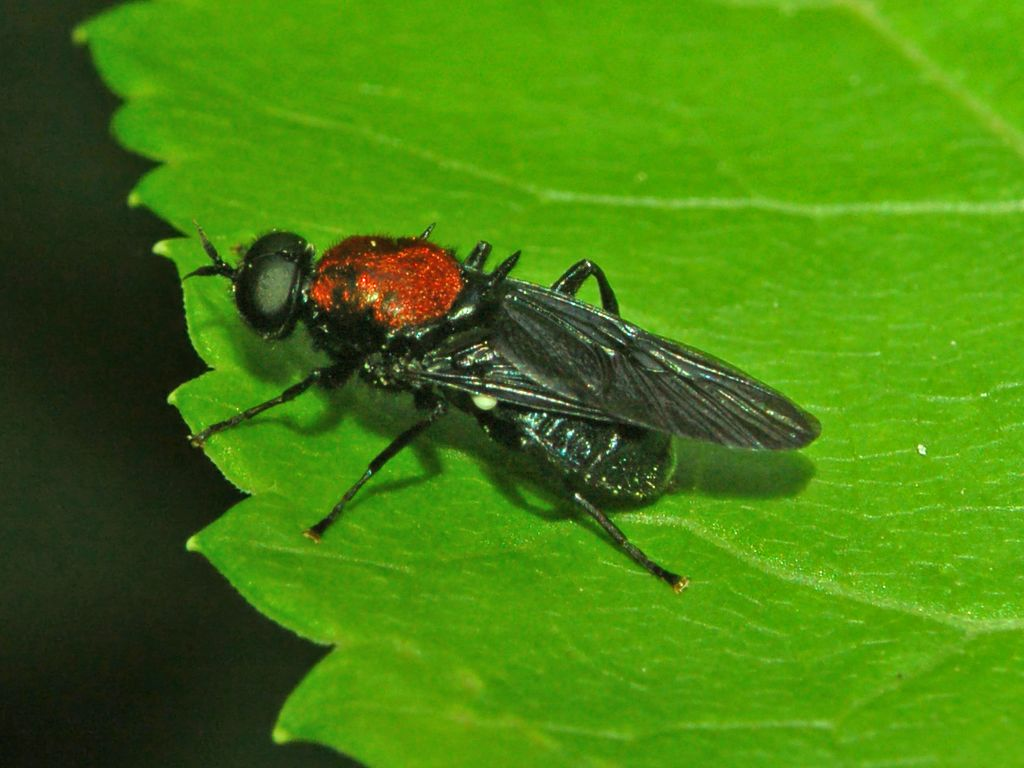
- Clitellaria ephippium male

Scientific classification
- Kingdom: Animalia
- Phylum: Arthropoda
- Clade: Pancrustacea
- Class: Insecta
- Order: Diptera
- Family: Stratiomyidae
- Subfamily: Clitellariinae
- Genus: Clitellaria; Meigen, 1803

Synonyms
- Ephippium Latreille, 1802; Potamida Meigen, 1800; Taurocera Lindner, 1936

= Clitellaria =

Genus of flies

Clitellaria is a genus of flies in the family Stratiomyidae.

== Species ==
- Clitellaria aurantia Yang, Zhang & Li, 2014
- Clitellaria aurofasciata (Brunetti, 1924)
- Clitellaria bergeri (Pleske, 1925)
- Clitellaria bicolor Yang, Zhang & Li, 2014
- Clitellaria bilineata (Fabricius, 1805)
- Clitellaria chikuni Yang & Nagatomi, 1992
- Clitellaria crassistilus Yang & Nagatomi, 1992
- Clitellaria ephippium (Fabricius, 1775)
- Clitellaria flavipilosa Yang & Nagatomi, 1992
- Clitellaria ignifera (Brunetti, 1923)
- Clitellaria kunmingana Yang & Nagatomi, 1992
- Clitellaria longipilosa Yang & Nagatomi, 1992
- Clitellaria mediflava Yang & Nagatomi, 1992
- Clitellaria microspina Yang, Zhang & Li, 2014
- Clitellaria nigra Yang & Nagatomi, 1992
- Clitellaria obliquispina Yang, Zhang & Li, 2014
- Clitellaria obtusa (James, 1941)
- Clitellaria orientalis (Lindner, 1951)
- Clitellaria pontica (Lindner, 1936)
- Clitellaria stylata (Brunetti, 1923)
