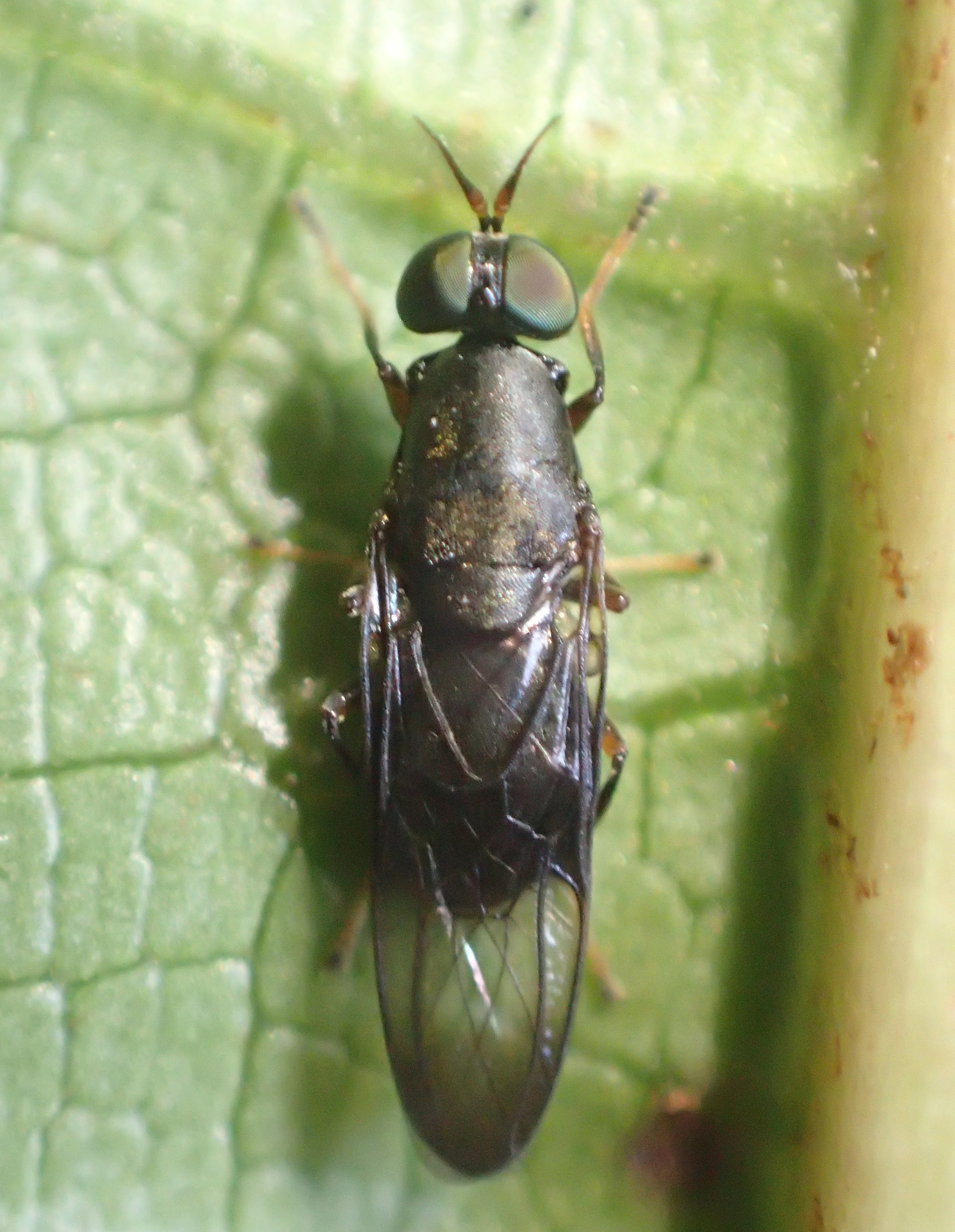

Scientific classification
- Kingdom: Animalia
- Phylum: Arthropoda
- Clade: Pancrustacea
- Class: Insecta
- Order: Diptera
- Family: Stratiomyidae
- Genus: Dysbiota
- Species: D. peregrina

Binomial name
- Dysbiota peregrina (Hutton, 1901)

Synonyms
- Cyclogaster peregrinus Hutton, 1901

= Dysbiota peregrina =

Species of fly

Dysbiota peregrina is a species of soldier fly endemic to New Zealand.

== Taxonomy ==
This species was first described as Cyclogaster peregrinus in 1901 by Frederick Hutton from specimens collected from Whangarei and Auckland. It was transferred to the genus Dysbiota in 1958.

== Description ==
The adult is bluish-black in overall colour and is around 5.5mm in length. The wings are coloured somewhat smoky and are darkened at the tip.
