= Alopecuroceras =

Scientific classification
- Kingdom: Animalia
- Phylum: Arthropoda
- Clade: Pancrustacea
- Class: Insecta
- Order: Diptera
- Family: Stratiomyidae
- Subfamily: Clitellariinae
- Genus: Alopecuroceras; Lindner, 1936

Type species
- Alopecuroceras coloratum Lindner, 1936

Genus of flies

Alopecuroceras is a genus of flies in the family Stratiomyidae.

== Species ==
- Alopecuroceras atripluma James, 1960
- Alopecuroceras coloratum Lindner, 1936
