= Labocerina =

Scientific classification
- Kingdom: Animalia
- Phylum: Arthropoda
- Clade: Pancrustacea
- Class: Insecta
- Order: Diptera
- Family: Stratiomyidae
- Subfamily: Clitellariinae
- Genus: Labocerina; Enderlein, 1914

Type species
- Stratiomys atrata Fabricius, 1805

Synonyms
- Labacerino Enderlein, 1914; Labocerino James, 1940

Genus of flies

Labocerina is a genus of flies in the family Stratiomyidae.

== Species ==
- Labocerina atrata (Fabricius, 1805)
