= Chromatopoda =

Scientific classification
- Kingdom: Animalia
- Phylum: Arthropoda
- Clade: Pancrustacea
- Class: Insecta
- Order: Diptera
- Family: Stratiomyidae
- Subfamily: Chrysochlorininae
- Genus: Chromatopoda; Brauer, 1882

Type species
- Chrysochlora bicolor Macquart, 1855

Genus of flies

Chromatopoda is a genus of flies in the family Stratiomyidae.

== Species ==
- Chromatopoda annulipes (Walker, 1849)
