= Syndipnomyia =

Scientific classification
- Kingdom: Animalia
- Phylum: Arthropoda
- Clade: Pancrustacea
- Class: Insecta
- Order: Diptera
- Family: Stratiomyidae
- Subfamily: Clitellariinae
- Genus: Syndipnomyia; Kertész, 1921

Type species
- Syndipnomyia auricincta Kertész, 1921

Genus of flies

Syndipnomyia is a genus of flies in the family Stratiomyidae.

== Species ==
- Syndipnomyia armata (Wulp, 1885)
- Syndipnomyia auricincta Kertész, 1921
- Syndipnomyia odyneroides Hollis, 1963
