= Rubredoxin—NAD(P)(+) reductase =

Enzyme

rubredoxin—NAD(P)+ reductase

Identifiers
- EC no.: 1.18.1.4
- CAS no.: 114514-31-7

Databases
- IntEnz: IntEnz view
- BRENDA: BRENDA entry
- ExPASy: NiceZyme view
- KEGG: KEGG entry
- MetaCyc: metabolic pathway
- PRIAM: profile
- PDB structures: RCSB PDB PDBe PDBsum
- Gene Ontology: AmiGO / QuickGO
Search
- PMC: articles
- PubMed: articles
- NCBI: proteins

In enzymology, a rubredoxin—NAD(P)+ reductase (EC 1.18.1.4) is an enzyme that catalyzes the chemical reaction

reduced rubredoxin + NAD(P)+ $\rightleftharpoons$ oxidized rubredoxin + NAD(P)H + H^{+}

The 3 substrates of this enzyme are reduced rubredoxin, NAD^{+}, and NADP^{+}, whereas its 4 products are oxidized rubredoxin, NADH, NADPH, and H^{+}.

This enzyme belongs to the family of oxidoreductases, specifically those acting on iron-sulfur proteins as donor with NAD+ or NADP+ as acceptor. The systematic name of this enzyme class is rubredoxin:NAD(P)+ oxidoreductase. Other names in common use include rubredoxin-nicotinamide adenine dinucleotide (phosphate) reductase, rubredoxin-nicotinamide adenine, dinucleotide phosphate reductase, NAD(P)+-rubredoxin oxidoreductase, and NAD(P)H-rubredoxin oxidoreductase. This enzyme participates in fatty acid metabolism.

== See also ==
- Rubredoxin—NAD(+) reductase
