= Dieuryneura =

Scientific classification
- Kingdom: Animalia
- Phylum: Arthropoda
- Clade: Pancrustacea
- Class: Insecta
- Order: Diptera
- Family: Stratiomyidae
- Subfamily: Clitellariinae
- Genus: Dieuryneura; James, 1937

Type species
- Dieuryneura callosa James, 1937

Genus of flies

Dieuryneura is a genus of flies in the family Stratiomyidae.

== Species ==
- Dieuryneura stigma (Giglio-Tos, 1891)
