= Leucoptilum =

Scientific classification
- Kingdom: Animalia
- Phylum: Arthropoda
- Clade: Pancrustacea
- Class: Insecta
- Order: Diptera
- Family: Stratiomyidae
- Subfamily: Clitellariinae
- Genus: Leucoptilum; James, 1943

Type species
- Leucoptilum plaumanni James, 1943

Genus of flies

Leucoptilum is a genus of flies in the family Stratiomyidae.

== Species ==
- Leucoptilum bassleri James, 1943
- Leucoptilum plaumanni James, 1943
