= Progrypomyia =

Scientific classification
- Kingdom: Animalia
- Phylum: Arthropoda
- Clade: Pancrustacea
- Class: Insecta
- Order: Diptera
- Family: Stratiomyidae
- Subfamily: Clitellariinae
- Genus: Progrypomyia; Lindner, 1949

Type species
- Progrypomyia nigra Lindner, 1949

Synonyms
- Progrypomyia Lindner, 1949

Genus of flies

Progrypomyia is a genus of flies in the family Stratiomyidae.

== Species ==
- Progrypomyia nigra Lindner, 1949

== Distribution ==
The genus is found in Brazil.
