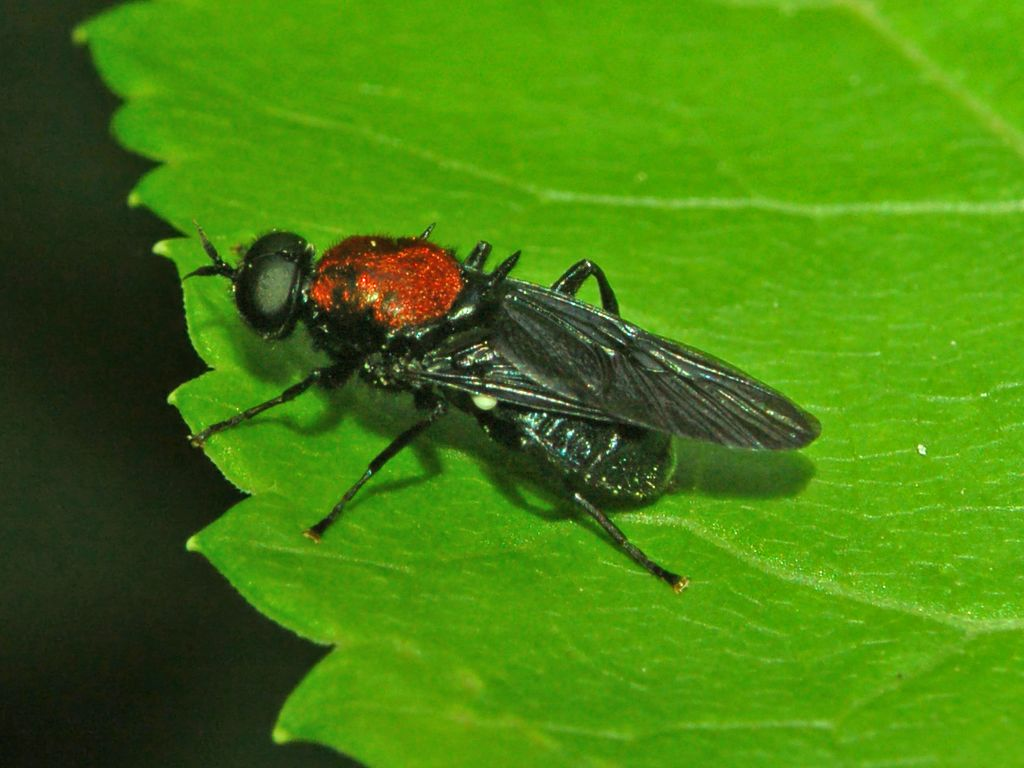
- Clitellaria ephippium. Male, side view

Scientific classification
- Kingdom: Animalia
- Phylum: Arthropoda
- Class: Insecta
- Order: Diptera
- Family: Stratiomyidae
- Subfamily: Clitellariinae
- Genus: Clitellaria
- Species: C. ephippium

Binomial name
- Clitellaria ephippium (Fabricius, 1775)

Synonyms
- Stratiomys ephippium Fabricius, 1775; Musca sellata Fuessly, 1775; Musca inda Schrank, 1781; Stratiomys schaefferi Geoffroy, 1785; Stratiomys coccinea Geoffroy, 1785; Ephippium thoracicum Latreille, 1805; Stratiomys euphippium Róndani, 1856

= Clitellaria ephippium =

Species of fly

Clitellaria ephippium is a species of soldier fly (so named for the thorns that armor the body) belonging to the family Stratiomyidae.

== Distribution ==
This species is present in Austria, Belgium, Germany, Italy, Hungary, central and southern Russia, Spain and in Switzerland.

== Description ==
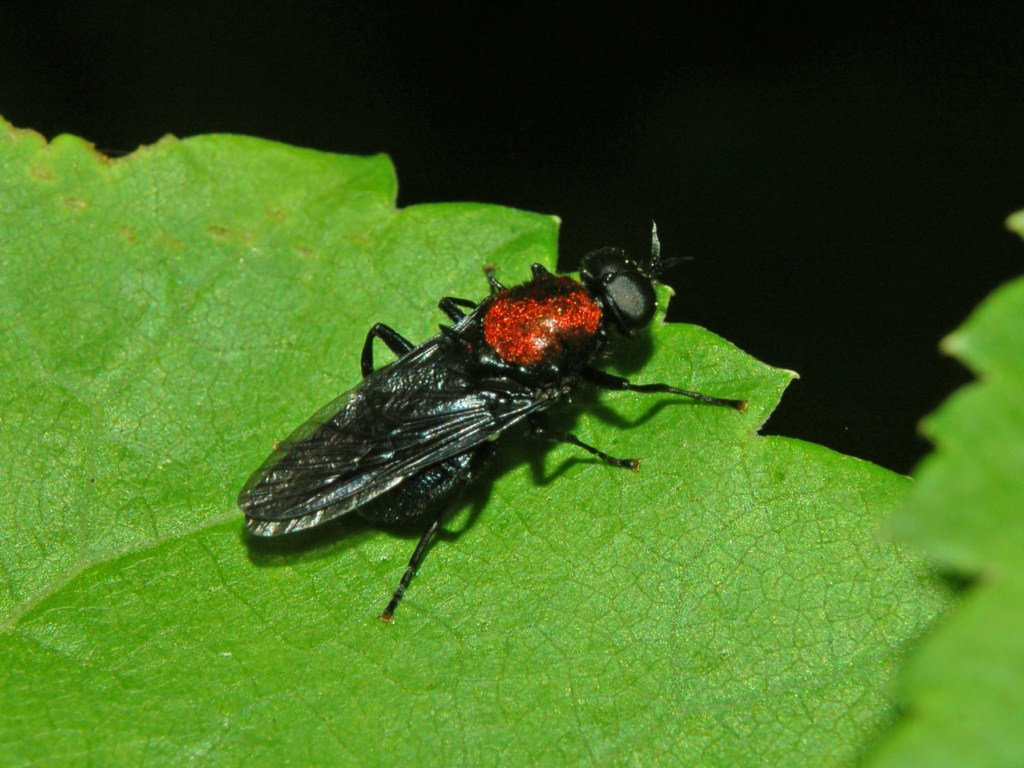
Clitellaria ephippium. Dorsal view

The adults grow up to 10–13 millimetres (0.39–0.51 in) long. The most of their body is black, with a bright red mesonotum. Antennae are no longer than the head, the third articulation of antennae is composed of five segments, the stylet of two segments. The eyes are dark and quite hairy. Scutellum is hairy and mesonotum shows two strong apico-lateral spines. Scutum has two strong lateral spines, placed between the transverse suture and the insertion of the wings. The abdomen is relatively wide. The wings are dark.

== Biology ==
The predatory larvae of this species develop in ant nests, such as Lasius fuliginosus (synonym Formica fuliginosa) (Formicidae).

== Bibliography ==
- Rozkošný, R. 1998. Chapter 24. Family Stratiomyidae. Manual Palaearct. Dipt. 2: 387-411.
- Joachim Haupt, Hiroko Haupt: Fliegen und Mücken. Beobachtung, Lebensweise. 1. Auflage. Naturbuch-Verlag, Jena und Stuttgart 1995, ISBN 3-89440-278-4.
