= Porpocera =

Scientific classification
- Kingdom: Animalia
- Phylum: Arthropoda
- Clade: Pancrustacea
- Class: Insecta
- Order: Diptera
- Family: Stratiomyidae
- Subfamily: Chrysochlorininae
- Genus: Porpocera; Enderlein, 1914

Type species
- Porpocera fibulata Enderlein, 1914

Genus of flies

Porpocera is a genus of flies in the family Stratiomyidae.

== Species ==
- Porpocera fibulata Enderlein, 1914
- Porpocera horrida Lindner, 1958
