= Caenocephaloides =

Scientific classification
- Kingdom: Animalia
- Phylum: Arthropoda
- Clade: Pancrustacea
- Class: Insecta
- Order: Diptera
- Family: Stratiomyidae
- Subfamily: Clitellariinae
- Genus: Caenocephaloides; Strand, 1928

Type species
- Salduba melanaria Walker, 1861

Synonyms
- Caenocephalus Wulp, 1898; Coenocephala Brunetti, 1923

Genus of flies

Caenocephaloides is a genus of flies in the family Stratiomyidae.

== Species ==
- Caenocephaloides melanarius (Walker, 1861)
