= Elissoma =

Scientific classification
- Kingdom: Animalia
- Phylum: Arthropoda
- Clade: Pancrustacea
- Class: Insecta
- Order: Diptera
- Family: Stratiomyidae
- Subfamily: Clitellariinae
- Genus: Elissoma; White, 1916

Type species
- Elissoma lauta White, 1916

Genus of flies

Elissoma is a genus of flies in the family Stratiomyidae.

== Species ==
- Elissoma brunnea Hardy, 1933
- Elissoma lauta White, 1916
