= Diaphorostylus =

Scientific classification
- Kingdom: Animalia
- Phylum: Arthropoda
- Clade: Pancrustacea
- Class: Insecta
- Order: Diptera
- Family: Stratiomyidae
- Subfamily: Clitellariinae
- Genus: Diaphorostylus; Kertész, 1908

Type species
- Diaphorostylus nasica Williston, 1888

Genus of flies

Diaphorostylus is a genus of flies in the family Stratiomyidae.

== Species ==
- Diaphorostylus flavipes Kertész, 1908
- Diaphorostylus interruptus James, 1939
- Diaphorostylus nasica (Williston, 1888)
- Diaphorostylus signatipes Kertész, 1908
