= Abasanistus =

Scientific classification
- Kingdom: Animalia
- Phylum: Arthropoda
- Clade: Pancrustacea
- Class: Insecta
- Order: Diptera
- Family: Stratiomyidae
- Subfamily: Clitellariinae
- Genus: Abasanistus; Kertész, 1923

Type species
- Abasanistus rubricornis Kertész, 1923

Genus of flies

Abasanistus is a genus of flies in the family Stratiomyidae.

== Species ==
- Abasanistus aureopictus James, 1973
- Abasanistus claviger James, 1973
- Abasanistus paulseni (Philippi, 1865)
- Abasanistus rubriceps (Philippi, 1865)
- Abasanistus rubricornis Kertész, 1923
