= Acropeltates =

Scientific classification
- Kingdom: Animalia
- Phylum: Arthropoda
- Clade: Pancrustacea
- Class: Insecta
- Order: Diptera
- Family: Stratiomyidae
- Subfamily: Clitellariinae
- Genus: Acropeltates; Kertész, 1923

Type species
- Acropeltates fasciata Kertész, 1923

Genus of flies

Acropeltates is a genus of flies in the family Stratiomyidae.

== Species ==
- Acropeltates diversicornis Kertész, 1923
- Acropeltates fasciata Kertész, 1923
- Acropeltates kerteszi Szilády, 1929
