= Chordonota =

- Chordonota inermis

Scientific classification
- Kingdom: Animalia
- Phylum: Arthropoda
- Clade: Pancrustacea
- Class: Insecta
- Order: Diptera
- Family: Stratiomyidae
- Subfamily: Clitellariinae
- Genus: Chordonota; Gerstaecker, 1857

Type species
- Chordonota inermis Wiedemann, 1830

Genus of flies

Chordonota is a genus of flies in the family Stratiomyidae.

== Species ==
- Chordonota aterrima James, 1940
- Chordonota flavitarsis (Enderlein, 1914)
- Chordonota fuscipennis Bellardi, 1862
- Chordonota inermis (Wiedemann, 1830)
- Chordonota leiophthalma Williston, 1896
- Chordonota nigra Williston, 1888
- Chordonota vittata (Wulp, 1881)
