= Anoamyia =

Scientific classification
- Kingdom: Animalia
- Phylum: Arthropoda
- Clade: Pancrustacea
- Class: Insecta
- Order: Diptera
- Family: Stratiomyidae
- Subfamily: Clitellariinae
- Genus: Anoamyia; Lindner, 1935

Type species
- Anoamyia heinrichiana Lindner, 1935

Genus of flies

Anoamyia is a genus of flies in the family Stratiomyidae.

== Species ==
- Anoamyia heinrichiana Lindner, 1935
- Anoamyia javana James, 1936
- Anoamyia rectispina Yang, Zhang & Li, 2014
