= Trichocercocera =

Scientific classification
- Kingdom: Animalia
- Phylum: Arthropoda
- Clade: Pancrustacea
- Class: Insecta
- Order: Diptera
- Family: Stratiomyidae
- Subfamily: Chrysochlorininae
- Genus: Trichocercocera; Lindner, 1928

Type species
- Trichocercocera ptecticoides Lindner, 1928

Genus of flies

Trichocercocera is a genus of flies in the family Stratiomyidae.

== Species ==
- Trichocercocera ptecticoides Lindner, 1928
