= Grypomyia =

Scientific classification
- Kingdom: Animalia
- Phylum: Arthropoda
- Clade: Pancrustacea
- Class: Insecta
- Order: Diptera
- Family: Stratiomyidae
- Subfamily: Clitellariinae
- Genus: Grypomyia; Kertész, 1923

Type species
- Grypomyia gracilis Kertész, 1923

Genus of flies

Grypomyia is a genus of flies in the family Stratiomyidae.

== Species ==
- Grypomyia gracilis Kertész, 1923
