= Pelagomyia =

Scientific classification
- Kingdom: Animalia
- Phylum: Arthropoda
- Clade: Pancrustacea
- Class: Insecta
- Order: Diptera
- Family: Stratiomyidae
- Subfamily: Chrysochlorininae
- Genus: Pelagomyia; Williston, 1896

Type species
- Pelagomyia albitalis Williston, 1896

Genus of flies

Pelagomyia is a genus of flies in the family Stratiomyidae.

== Species ==
- Pelagomyia albitalis Williston, 1896 - St. Vincent.
- Pelagomyia illucens James, 1967 - Dominica
