= Nigritomyia =

Scientific classification
- Kingdom: Animalia
- Phylum: Arthropoda
- Clade: Pancrustacea
- Class: Insecta
- Order: Diptera
- Family: Stratiomyidae
- Subfamily: Clitellariinae
- Genus: Nigritomyia; Bigot, 1877

Type species
- Ephippium maculipennis Macquart, 1850

Synonyms
- Negritomya Bigot, 1877; Negritomyia Bigot, 1880; Negritomyia Bigot, 1880; Nigritomya Brauer, 1882; Megritomyia Ôuchi, 1938

Genus of flies

Nigritomyia is a genus of flies in the family Stratiomyidae.

== Species ==
- Nigritomyia albitarsis (Bigot, 1879)
- Nigritomyia andamanensis Das, Sharma & Dev Roy, 1984
- Nigritomyia basiflava Yang, Zhang & Li, 2014
- Nigritomyia ceylonica Kertész, 1920
- Nigritomyia cinerea (Doleschall, 1857)
- Nigritomyia consobrina (Bigot, 1879)
- Nigritomyia festinans (Walker, 1859)
- Nigritomyia guangxiensis Li, Zhang & Yang, 2009
- Nigritomyia maculipennis (Macquart, 1850)
- Nigritomyia punctifrons James, 1969
- Nigritomyia responsalis (Walker, 1865)
- Nigritomyia separata James, 1969
