= Geranopus =

Scientific classification
- Kingdom: Animalia
- Phylum: Arthropoda
- Clade: Pancrustacea
- Class: Insecta
- Order: Diptera
- Family: Stratiomyidae
- Subfamily: Clitellariinae
- Genus: Geranopus; White, 1916

Type species
- Geranopus purpuratus White, 1916

Genus of flies

Geranopus is a genus of flies in the family Stratiomyidae.

== Species ==
- Geranopus purpuratus White, 1916
