= Homalarthria =

Scientific classification
- Kingdom: Animalia
- Phylum: Arthropoda
- Clade: Pancrustacea
- Class: Insecta
- Order: Diptera
- Family: Stratiomyidae
- Subfamily: Clitellariinae
- Genus: Homalarthria; Lindner, 1933

Type species
- Homalarthria nigra Lindner, 1933

Genus of flies

Homalarthria is a genus of flies in the family Stratiomyidae.

== Species ==
- Homalarthria nigra Lindner, 1933
