= Chrysochlorininae =

Scientific classification
- Kingdom: Animalia
- Phylum: Arthropoda
- Clade: Pancrustacea
- Class: Insecta
- Order: Diptera
- Family: Stratiomyidae
- Subfamily: Chrysochlorininae; Woodley, 2001

Subfamily of flies

Chrysochlorininae is a subfamily of flies in the family Stratiomyidae.

== Genera ==
- Cacosis Walker, 1851
- Chromatopoda Brauer, 1882
- Chrysochlora Latreille, 1829
- Chrysochlorina James, 1939
- Labogastria Enderlein, 1914
- Pelagomyia Williston, 1896
- Porpocera Enderlein, 1914
- Trichocercocera Lindner, 1928
