= Dicyphoma =

Scientific classification
- Kingdom: Animalia
- Phylum: Arthropoda
- Clade: Pancrustacea
- Class: Insecta
- Order: Diptera
- Family: Stratiomyidae
- Subfamily: Clitellariinae
- Genus: Dicyphoma; James, 1937

Type species
- Dicyphoma schaefferi Coquillett, 1904

Genus of flies

Dicyphoma is a genus of flies in the family Stratiomyidae.

== Species ==
- Dicyphoma ryckmani James, 1962
- Dicyphoma schaefferi (Coquillett, 1904)
