= Campeprosopa =

Scientific classification
- Kingdom: Animalia
- Phylum: Arthropoda
- Clade: Pancrustacea
- Class: Insecta
- Order: Diptera
- Family: Stratiomyidae
- Subfamily: Clitellariinae
- Genus: Campeprosopa; Macquart, 1850

Type species
- Campeprosopa flavipes Macquart, 1850

Synonyms
- Campoprosopa Scudder, 1882; Camptoprosopa Scudder, 1882; Compeprosopa White, 1916

Genus of flies

Campeprosopa is a genus of flies in the family Stratiomyidae.

== Species ==
- Campeprosopa bella Edwards, 1919
- Campeprosopa borneensis Lindner, 1937
- Campeprosopa flavipes Macquart, 1850
- Campeprosopa longispina (Brunetti, 1913)
- Campeprosopa munda Osten Sacken, 1881
- Campeprosopa ornata Edwards, 1919
- Campeprosopa pulchra Edwards, 1919
