= Rubredoxin A =

Rubredoxin A (RubA) is a protein conserved across all studied oxygenic photoautotrophs.

== Structure ==
As of March 2015 there was no crystal structure of RubA although a structure of the homologous protein from a cryptomonad was determined using NMR. Investigation of the gene however indicates that it differs from other known rubredoxins in being bound to the thylakoid membrane via a C-terminal transmembrane helix.

== Function ==
An investigation of Guillardia theta noted that RubA had a similar distribution to Photosystem II (PSII) and immunological experiments indicated the presence of RubA in PSII complexes isolated from Spinacia oleracea. In Synechocystis sp. PCC 6803 it has been demonstrated that the insertion of an antibiotic cassette into the rubA gene results in a marked decrease in the amount of PSII present, while the same mutation within Chlamydomonas reinhardtii and in Arabidopsis thaliana results in a total absence of PSII.

Conversely, another study performed in Synechococcus sp. PCC 7002 indicated that mutation of the rubA gene interfered with iron-sulphur cluster assembly in Photosystem I (PSI), rather than affecting PSII.
