= Rubredoxin =

Class of iron-containing proteins

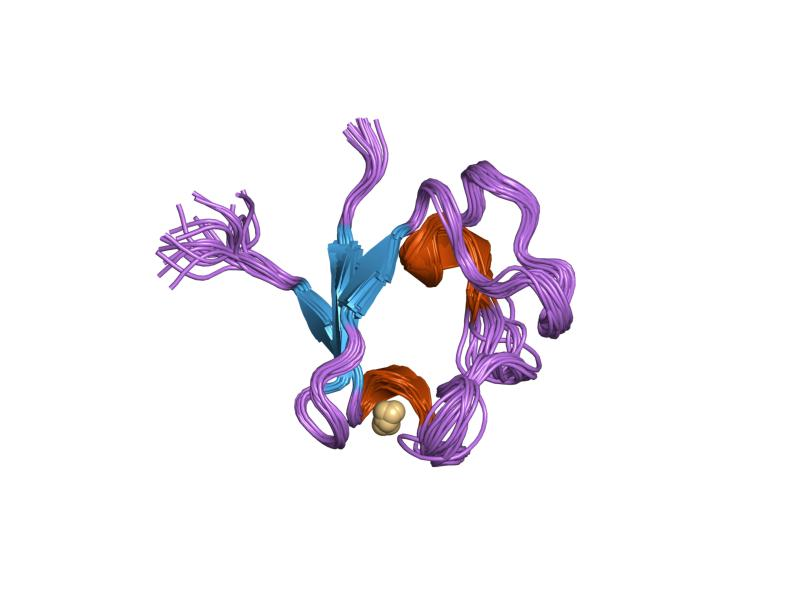
- rubredoxin domain ii from pseudomonas oleovorans

Identifiers
- Symbol: Rubredoxin
- Pfam: PF00301
- Pfam clan: CL0045
- InterPro: IPR004039
- PROSITE: PDOC00179
- SCOP2: 7rxn / SCOPe / SUPFAM
Available protein structures:
- PDB: IPR004039 PF00301 (ECOD; PDBsum)
- AlphaFold: IPR004039; PF00301

Rubredoxins are a class of low-molecular-weight iron-containing proteins found in sulfur-metabolizing bacteria and archaea. Sometimes rubredoxins are classified as iron-sulfur proteins; however, in contrast to iron-sulfur proteins, rubredoxins do not contain inorganic sulfide. Like cytochromes, ferredoxins and Rieske proteins, rubredoxins are thought to participate in electron transfer in biological systems. Recent work in bacteria and algae have led to the hypothesis that some rubredoxins may instead have a role in delivering iron to metalloproteins.

== Structure ==
The 3-D structures of a number of rubredoxins have been solved. The fold belongs to the α+β class, with 2 α-helices and 2-3 β-strands. Rubredoxin active site contains an iron ion which is coordinated by the sulfurs of four conserved cysteine residues forming an almost regular tetrahedron. This is sometimes denoted as a [1Fe-0S] or an Fe_{1}S_{0} system, in analogy to the nomenclature for iron-sulfur proteins. While the vast majority of rubredoxins are soluble, there exists a membrane-bound rubredoxin, referred to as rubredoxin A, in oxygenic photoautotrophs.

Rubredoxins perform one-electron transfer processes. The central iron atom changes between the +2 and +3 oxidation states. In both oxidation states, the metal remains high spin, which helps to minimize structural changes. The reduction potential of a rubredoxin is typically in the range +50 mV to -50 mV.

This iron-sulphur protein is an electron carrier, and it is easy to distinguish its metallic centre changes: the oxidized state is reddish (due to a ligand metal charge transfer), while the reduced state is colourless (because the electron transition has an energy of the infrared level, which is imperceptible to the human eye).

Structural representation of a rubredoxin active site

== Rubredoxin in some biochemical reactions ==
- EC 1.14.15.2 camphor 1,2-monooxygenase [(+)-camphor, reduced-rubredoxin:oxygen oxidoreductase (1,2-lactonizing)]
  - (+)-bornane-2,5-dione + reduced rubredoxin + O_{2} = 5-oxo-1,2-campholide + oxidized rubredoxin + H_{2}O
- EC 1.14.15.3 alkane 1-monooxygenase (alkane, reduced-rubredoxin:oxygen 1-oxidoreductase)
  - octane + reduced rubredoxin + O_{2} = 1-octanol + oxidized rubredoxin + H_{2}O
- EC 1.15.1.2 superoxide reductase (rubredoxin:superoxide oxidoreductase)
  - reduced rubredoxin + superoxide + 2 H^{+} = rubredoxin + H_{2}O_{2}
- EC 1.18.1.1 rubredoxin—NAD^{+} reductase (rubredoxin:NAD^{+} oxidoreductase)
  - reduced rubredoxin + NAD^{+} = oxidized rubredoxin + NADH + H^{+}
- EC 1.18.1.4 rubredoxin—NAD(P)^{+} reductase (rubredoxin:NAD(P)^{+} oxidoreductase)
  - reduced rubredoxin + NAD(P)^{+} = oxidized rubredoxin + NAD(P)H + H^{+}

== Electron transfer rate ==
The electron exchange rate is accurately determined by standard kinetics measurements of visible absorption (490 nm) spectra. The electron transfer rate has three parameters: electronic coupling, reorganization energy and free energy of reaction (ΔG°).

== Protein mechanism and effects ==
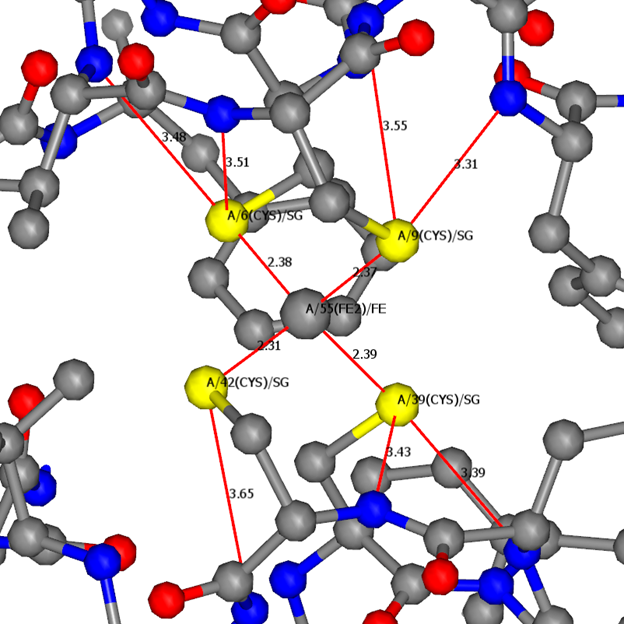
Fe-S and amide NH-S(Cys) bond lengths upon reduction

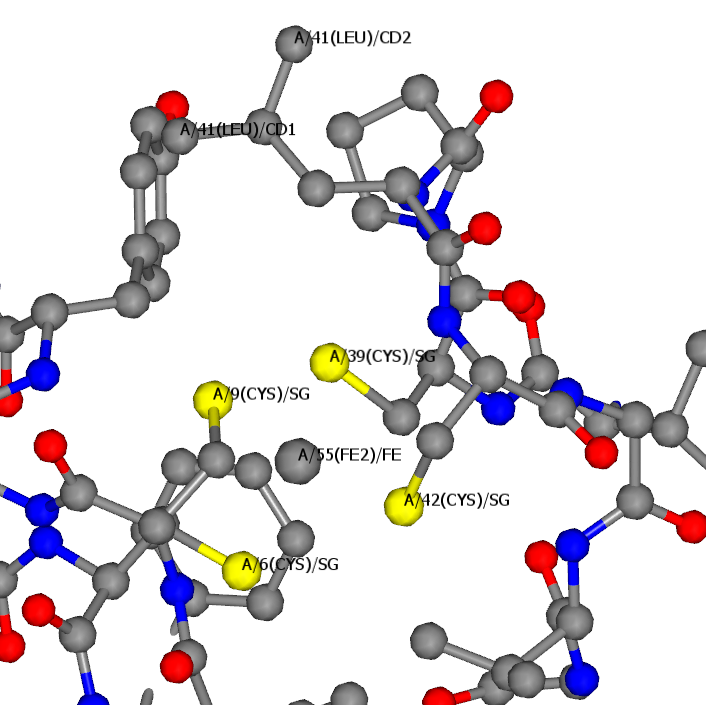
Leu41 gating mechanism in open conformation

The electron transfer reaction of rubredoxin is carried out by a reversible Fe^{3+}/Fe^{2+} redox coupling by the reduction of Fe^{3+} to Fe^{2+} and a gating mechanism caused by the conformational changes of Leu41.

Upon the reduction of Fe^{3+} to Fe^{2+}, the four Fe-S bond lengths increase and the amide-NH H-bonding to the S(Cys) become shortened. The reduced Fe^{2+} structure of rubredoxin results in a small increase in electrostatic stabilization of the amide-NH H-bonding to the S-Cys, leading to a lower reorganizational energy that allows faster electron transfer.

A gating mechanism involving the conformational change of the Leu41's non-polar sidechain further stabilizes the Fe^{2+} oxidation state. A site-directed mutagenesis of Leu41 to Alanine shows a 50mV shift of the Fe^{3+/2+}redox potential. The substitution of the smaller CH_{3} shows that the Leu41 side chain stabilizes the Fe^{2+} oxidation state more than the Fe^{3+} oxidation state. The X-ray structure in the reduced Fe^{2+} state shows the Leu41 side chain adopting two different conformations with 40% in an "open conformation" and 60% in a "closed conformation". The Leu41's non-polar side chain controls access to the redox site by adopting either an open or closed conformation. In the reduced Fe^{2+} state, the Leu41 side-chain faces away from Cys 9 Sγ, exposing the Cys 9 Sγ and increasing the polarity of the Fe^{3+} /Fe^{2+} center. ^{[1]} The lower Fe^{2+} cation change of the reduced state leaves a higher negative charge on the Cys 9 Sγ-donor which attracts water strongly. As a result, water is able to penetrate and form H-bonds with the Cys 9 Sγ thiolate that blocks the gate from closing, resulting in an open conformation. In contrast, the oxidized Fe^{3+} state produces a less negatively charged Cys 9 Sγ-donor that does not attract the water strongly. Without H-bonding of the water to the Cys 9 Sγ, the gate remains closed. Thus, the conformation of Leu41 is determined by the presence of water and the oxidation state of rubredoxin. The proximity of water to the [Fe(S-Cys)_{4}] ^{2-} active site stabilizes the higher net negative charge of the Fe^{2+} oxidation state. The stabilization of the Fe^{2+} oxidation state shifts the reduction potential to a more positive E^{0} value.

== See also ==
- Bioinorganic chemistry
- Iron-sulfur protein
- Ferredoxin
- Cytochrome
- Rieske protein
