= Ruba (fly) =

Scientific classification
- Kingdom: Animalia
- Phylum: Arthropoda
- Clade: Pancrustacea
- Class: Insecta
- Order: Diptera
- Family: Stratiomyidae
- Subfamily: Clitellariinae
- Genus: Ruba; Walker, 1860

Type species
- Ruba inflata Walker, 1859

Synonyms
- Thylacosoma Brauer, 1882

Genus of flies

Ruba is a genus of flies in the family Stratiomyidae.

== Species ==
- Ruba amboinensis (Brauer, 1882)
- Ruba bimaculata Yang, Zhang & Li, 2014
- Ruba cincta Brunetti, 1923
- Ruba fuscipennis Enderlein, 1914
- Ruba inflata Walker, 1859
- Ruba maculipennis Yang, Zhang & Li, 2014
- Ruba nigritibia Yang, Zhang & Li, 2014
- Ruba opponens Walker, 1865
- Ruba tarsalis James, 1948
