= Paulo Iide =

Brazilian entomologist (1939–2012)

- Born: 22 February 1939; Rio de Janeiro
- Died: July 21, 2012 (aged 73); Rio de Janeiro, Brazil
- Education: Federal Rural University of Rio de Janeiro
- Known for: Diptera
- Scientific career
- Fields: Entomology
- Workplaces: Universidade Federal Fluminense; Instituto Oswaldo Cruz

Paulo Iide (22 February 1939 – 21 July 2012) was a Brazilian entomologist who worked at the Universidade Federal Fluminense and at the Instituto Oswaldo Cruz in Rio de Janeiro, specializing in soldier flies (Stratiomyidae) and horse-flies (Tabanidae).

== Works ==
- Iide, P. 1966. Estudo sôbre as espécies brasileiras do gênero Chrysochlorina James, 1939 (Diptera, Stratiomyidae). Arquivos de Zoologia do Estado de São Paulo 14(2): 69–113.
- Iide, P. 1967. Estudo sôbre uma nova espeecie Amazionica de gienero "Cyphomyia" Wiedemann (Diptera, Stratioymidae). Atas do Simpósio sôbre a Biota Amazônica 5(Zoologia): 225–238.
- Iide, P. 1968. Contribuição ao conhecimento das espécies brasileiras do gênero “Euryneura” Schiner, 1867 (Diptera, Stratiomyidae). Revista Brasileira de Biologia 28(3): 251–272.
- Iide, P. 1971. Estudos sôbre os Stratiomyiidae da coleção do United States National Museum. II: O gênero Pelagomyia Williston, 1896 (Insecta, Diptera). Revista Brasileira de Biologia 31(4): 497–506.
