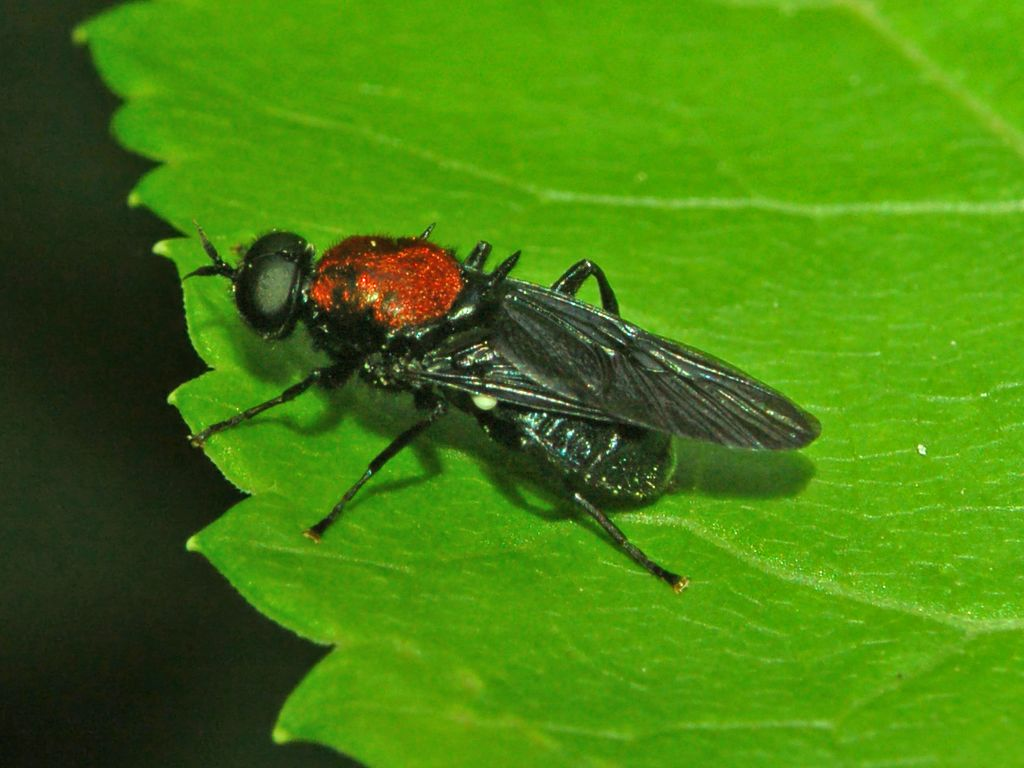
- Clitellaria ephippium male

Scientific classification
- Kingdom: Animalia
- Phylum: Arthropoda
- Clade: Pancrustacea
- Class: Insecta
- Order: Diptera
- Family: Stratiomyidae
- Subfamily: Clitellariinae; Brauer, 1882

= Clitellariinae =

Subfamily of flies

Clitellariinae is a subfamily of flies in the family Stratiomyidae.

== Genera ==
- Abasanistus Kertész, 1923
- Abavus Enderlein, 1914
- Acropeltates Kertész, 1923
- Adoxomyia Kertész, 1907
- Alopecuroceras Lindner, 1936
- Amphilecta Brauer, 1882
- Ampsalis Walker, 1859
- Anoamyia Lindner, 1935
- Caenocephaloides Strand, 1928
- Campeprosopa Macquart, 1850
- Chordonota Gerstaecker, 1857
- Clitellaria Meigen, 1803
- Cyphomyia Wiedemann, 1819
- Diaphorostylus Kertész, 1908
- Dicyphoma James, 1937
- Dieuryneura James, 1937
- Ditylometopa Kertész, 1923
- Dysbiota Lindner, 1958
- Elissoma White, 1916
- Eudmeta Wiedemann, 1830
- Euryneura Schiner, 1868
- Geranopus White, 1916
- Grypomyia Kertész, 1923
- Homalarthria Lindner, 1933
- Labocerina Enderlein, 1914
- Lagenosoma Brauer, 1882
- Leucoptilum James, 1943
- Meringostylus Kertész, 1908
- Nigritomyia Bigot, 1877
- Octarthria Brauer, 1882
- Platopsomyia James, 1937
- Progrypomyia Lindner, 1949
- Pycnomalla Gerstaecker, 1857
- Pycnothorax Kertész, 1923
- Ruba Walker, 1859
- Syndipnomyia Kertész, 1921
