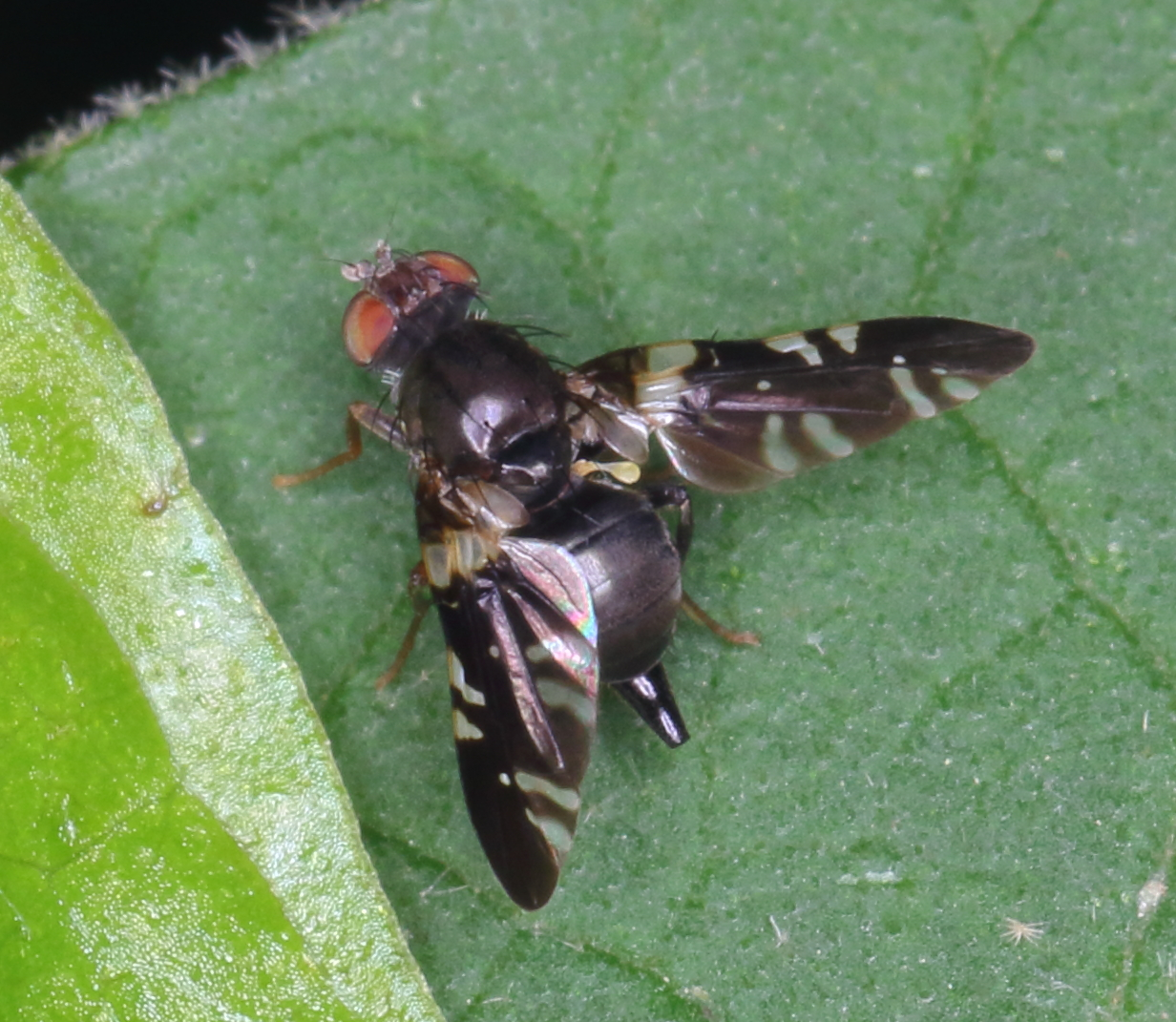
- Pediapelta spadicescens

Scientific classification
- Kingdom: Animalia
- Phylum: Arthropoda
- Class: Insecta
- Order: Diptera
- Family: Tephritidae
- Subfamily: Tephritinae
- Tribe: Tephrellini
- Genus: Pediapelta; Munro, 1947

Type species
- Pediapelta spadicescens Munro, 1947

= Pediapelta =

Genus of flies

Pediapelta is a monotypic genus of tephritid or fruit flies in the family Tephritidae.

== Species ==
- Pediapelta spadicescens Munro, 1947 is found in South Africa.

Dicheniotes aeneus (Munro), D. alexina (Munro), D. asmarensis (Munro), D. enzoria (Munro), D. parviguttatus (Hering), D. sokotrensis (Hering) and D. ternarius (Loew) were transferred from Pediapelta by Hancock (2012).
