= Clematochaeta discipulchra =

Scientific classification
- Kingdom: Animalia
- Phylum: Arthropoda
- Class: Insecta
- Order: Diptera
- Family: Tephritidae
- Subfamily: Tephritinae
- Tribe: Schistopterini
- Genus: Clematochaeta
- Species: C. discipulchra

Binomial name
- Clematochaeta discipulchra (Bezzi, 1918)

Synonyms
- Euribia discipulchra Bezzi, 1918, 1935

Species of fly

Clematochaeta discipulchra is a species of tephritid or fruit flies in the genus Clematochaeta of the family Tephritidae.

== Distribution ==
Malawi, Zimbabwe.
