= Rhabdochaeta naevia =

Scientific classification
- Kingdom: Animalia
- Phylum: Arthropoda
- Class: Insecta
- Order: Diptera
- Family: Tephritidae
- Subfamily: Tephritinae
- Tribe: Schistopterini
- Genus: Rhabdochaeta
- Species: R. naevia

Binomial name
- Rhabdochaeta naevia Ito, 1984

Species of fly

Rhabdochaeta naevia is a species of tephritid fruit flies in the genus Rhabdochaeta.

== Distribution ==
- Japan
