= Rhabdochaeta ampla =

Scientific classification
- Kingdom: Animalia
- Phylum: Arthropoda
- Class: Insecta
- Order: Diptera
- Family: Tephritidae
- Subfamily: Tephritinae
- Tribe: Schistopterini
- Genus: Rhabdochaeta
- Species: R. ampla

Binomial name
- Rhabdochaeta ampla Hardy, 1973

Species of fly

Rhabdochaeta ampla is a species of fruit fly in the family Tephritidae. It measures 4.5–4.75 mm (0.177–0.187 in) in total length.

== Distribution ==
The species is known from Thailand and Vietnam.
