= Eutretosoma woodi =

Scientific classification
- Kingdom: Animalia
- Phylum: Arthropoda
- Class: Insecta
- Order: Diptera
- Family: Tephritidae
- Subfamily: Tephritinae
- Tribe: Schistopterini
- Genus: Eutretosoma
- Species: E. woodi

Binomial name
- Eutretosoma woodi Hering, 1924

Species of fly

Eutretosoma woodi is a species of tephritid or fruit flies in the genus Eutretosoma of the family Tephritidae.

== Distribution ==
Malawi, South Africa.
