= Rhochmopterum arcoides =

Scientific classification
- Kingdom: Animalia
- Phylum: Arthropoda
- Class: Insecta
- Order: Diptera
- Family: Tephritidae
- Subfamily: Tephritinae
- Tribe: Schistopterini
- Genus: Rhochmopterum
- Species: R. arcoides

Binomial name
- Rhochmopterum arcoides Munro, 1935

Species of fly

Rhochmopterum arcoides is a species of tephritid or fruit flies in the genus Rhochmopterum of the family Tephritidae.

== Distribution ==
South Africa.
