= Brachiopterna katonae =

Scientific classification
- Kingdom: Animalia
- Phylum: Arthropoda
- Class: Insecta
- Order: Diptera
- Family: Tephritidae
- Subfamily: Tephritinae
- Tribe: Schistopterini
- Genus: Brachiopterna
- Species: B. katonae

Binomial name
- Brachiopterna katonae Bezzi, 1924

Synonyms
- Brachiopterna katonai Munro, 1935

Species of fly

Brachiopterna katonae is a species of tephritid or fruit flies in the genus Brachiopterna of the family Tephritidae. Named after the Hungarian zoologist, Kalman Kittenberger's pseudonym, Katona.

== Distribution ==
Tanzania.
