= Brachiopterna =

Scientific classification
- Kingdom: Animalia
- Phylum: Arthropoda
- Clade: Pancrustacea
- Class: Insecta
- Order: Diptera
- Family: Tephritidae
- Subfamily: Tephritinae
- Tribe: Schistopterini
- Genus: Brachiopterna; Bezzi, 1924

Type species
- Brachiopterna katonae Bezzi, 1924

Synonyms
- Cyanodesmops Munro, 1931

Genus of flies

Brachiopterna is a genus of tephritid or fruit flies in the family Tephritidae. Named after the Hungarian zoologist, Kalman Kittenberger's pseudonym, Katona.

== Species ==
- Brachiopterna katonae Bezzi, 1924
- Brachiopterna ornithomorpha (Munro, 1931)
