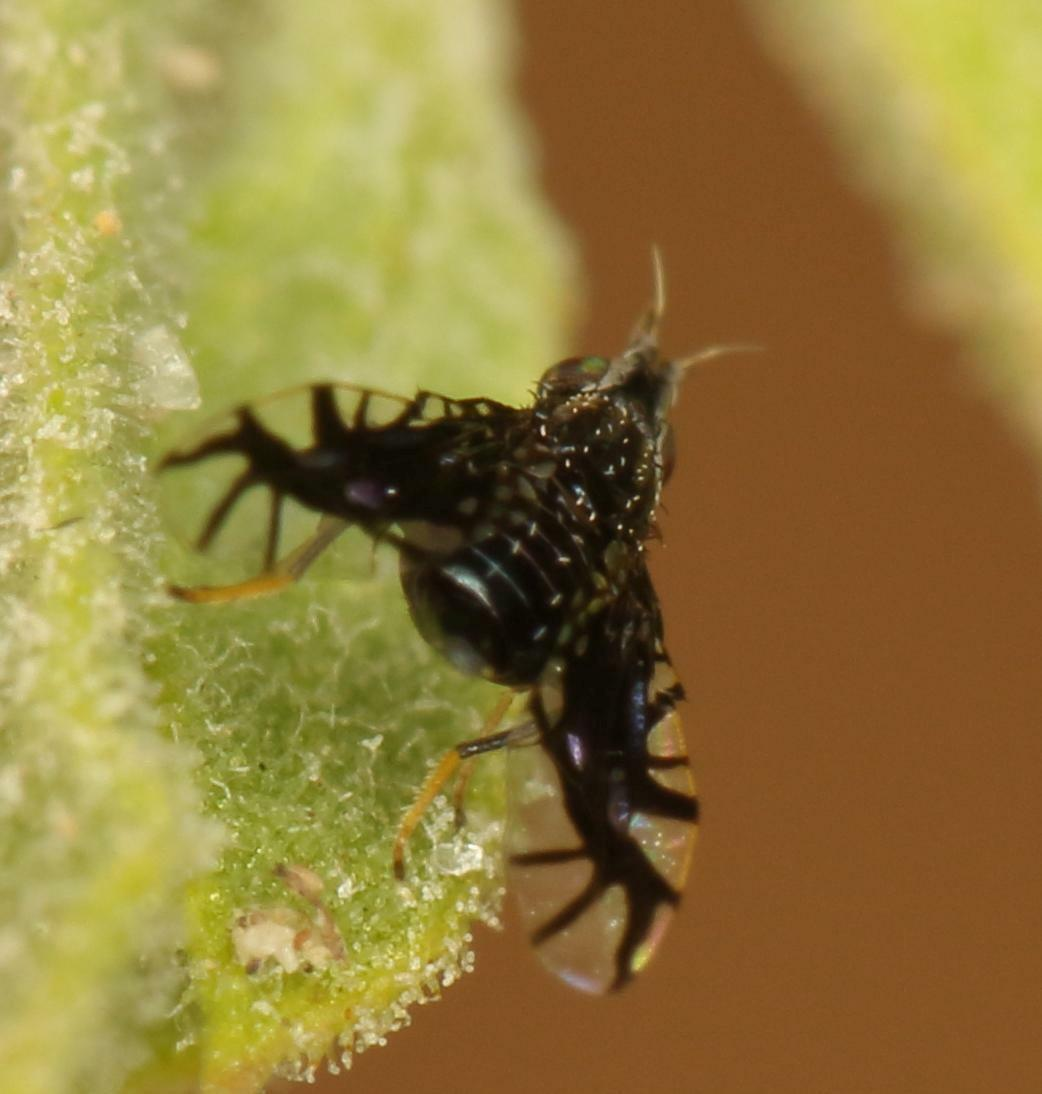

Scientific classification
- Kingdom: Animalia
- Phylum: Arthropoda
- Class: Insecta
- Order: Diptera
- Family: Tephritidae
- Subfamily: Tephritinae
- Tribe: Schistopterini
- Genus: Brachiopterna
- Species: B. ornithomorpha

Binomial name
- Brachiopterna ornithomorpha (Munro, 1931)

Synonyms
- Cyanodesmops ornithomorpha Munro, 1935

= Brachiopterna ornithomorpha =

Species of fly

Brachiopterna ornithomorpha is a species of tephritid or fruit flies in the family Tephritidae.

== Distribution ==
Zimbabwe, South Africa.
