= Schistopterum moebiusi =

Scientific classification
- Kingdom: Animalia
- Phylum: Arthropoda
- Class: Insecta
- Order: Diptera
- Family: Tephritidae
- Subfamily: Tephritinae
- Tribe: Schistopterini
- Genus: Schistopterum
- Species: S. moebiusi

Binomial name
- Schistopterum moebiusi Becker, 1902

Synonyms
- Schistopterum moebii Bezzi, 1908

Species of fly

Schistopterum moebiusi is a species of tephritid or fruit flies in the genus Schistopterum of the family Tephritidae.

== Distribution ==
Israel, Egypt, most of East Africa, South Africa.
