= Heringomyia albipilosa =

Scientific classification
- Kingdom: Animalia
- Phylum: Arthropoda
- Class: Insecta
- Order: Diptera
- Family: Tephritidae
- Subfamily: Tephritinae
- Tribe: Schistopterini
- Genus: Heringomyia
- Species: H. albipilosa

Binomial name
- Heringomyia albipilosa (Hering, 1940)

Synonyms
- Cladotricha albipilosa Hering, 1940

Species of fly

Heringomyia albipilosa is a species of tephritid or fruit flies in the genus Heringomyia of the family Tephritidae.

== Distribution ==
Kenya.
