= Rhochmopterum melanurum =

Scientific classification
- Kingdom: Animalia
- Phylum: Arthropoda
- Class: Insecta
- Order: Diptera
- Family: Tephritidae
- Subfamily: Tephritinae
- Tribe: Schistopterini
- Genus: Rhochmopterum
- Species: R. melanurum

Binomial name
- Rhochmopterum melanurum (Bezzi, 1926)

Synonyms
- Rhabdochaeta melanura Bezzi, 1926

Species of fly

Rhochmopterum melanurum is a species of tephritid or fruit flies in the genus Rhochmopterum of the family Tephritidae.

== Distribution ==
Philippines.
