= Rhabdochaeta lutescens =

Scientific classification
- Kingdom: Animalia
- Phylum: Arthropoda
- Class: Insecta
- Order: Diptera
- Family: Tephritidae
- Subfamily: Tephritinae
- Tribe: Schistopterini
- Genus: Rhabdochaeta
- Species: R. lutescens

Binomial name
- Rhabdochaeta lutescens (Bezzi, 1924)

Synonyms
- Rhochmopterum lutescens Bezzi, 1924

Species of fly

Rhabdochaeta lutescens is a species of tephritid or fruit flies in the genus Rhabdochaeta of the family Tephritidae.

== Distribution ==
Ethiopia, Rwanda, Tanzania.
