= Rhabdochaeta pulchella =

Scientific classification
- Kingdom: Animalia
- Phylum: Arthropoda
- Class: Insecta
- Order: Diptera
- Family: Tephritidae
- Subfamily: Tephritinae
- Tribe: Schistopterini
- Genus: Rhabdochaeta
- Species: R. pulchella

Binomial name
- Rhabdochaeta pulchella Meijere, 1904

Synonyms
- Rhabdochaeta assidua Ito, 1984; Rhabdochaeta bakeri Bezzi, 1914; Rhabdochaeta mucronata Hering, 1942

Species of fly

Rhabdochaeta pulchella is a species of tephritid or fruit flies in the genus Rhabdochaeta of the family Tephritidae.

== Distribution ==
India, Sri Lanka, Thailand, Laos, Vietnam, Japan, Philippines, Malaysia, Indonesia, Papua New Guinea, Australia.
