= Rhochmopterum parva =

Scientific classification
- Kingdom: Animalia
- Phylum: Arthropoda
- Class: Insecta
- Order: Diptera
- Family: Tephritidae
- Subfamily: Tephritinae
- Tribe: Schistopterini
- Genus: Rhochmopterum
- Species: R. parva

Binomial name
- Rhochmopterum parva (Hardy, 1974)

Synonyms
- Rhabdochaeta parva Hardy, 1974

Species of fly

Rhochmopterum parva is a species of tephritid or fruit flies in the genus Rhochmopterum of the family Tephritidae.

== Distribution ==
Tanzania.
