= Heringomyia zernyana =

Scientific classification
- Kingdom: Animalia
- Phylum: Arthropoda
- Class: Insecta
- Order: Diptera
- Family: Tephritidae
- Subfamily: Tephritinae
- Tribe: Schistopterini
- Genus: Heringomyia
- Species: H. zernyana

Binomial name
- Heringomyia zernyana (Hering, 1941)

Synonyms
- Cladotricha zernyana Hering, 1941

Species of fly

Heringomyia zernyana is a species of tephritid or fruit flies in the genus Heringomyia of the family Tephritidae.

== Distribution ==
Tanzania, Zimbabwe.
