= Heringomyia fordianum =

Scientific classification
- Kingdom: Animalia
- Phylum: Arthropoda
- Class: Insecta
- Order: Diptera
- Family: Tephritidae
- Subfamily: Tephritinae
- Tribe: Schistopterini
- Genus: Heringomyia
- Species: H. fordianum

Binomial name
- Heringomyia fordianum Munro, 1935

Synonyms
- Rhochmopterum fordianum Munro, 1935

Species of fly

Heringomyia fordianum is a species of tephritid or fruit flies in the genus Heringomyia of the family Tephritidae.

== Distribution ==
Rwanda, Zimbabwe.
