= Rhochmopterum majus =

Scientific classification
- Kingdom: Animalia
- Phylum: Arthropoda
- Class: Insecta
- Order: Diptera
- Family: Tephritidae
- Subfamily: Tephritinae
- Tribe: Schistopterini
- Genus: Rhochmopterum
- Species: R. majus

Binomial name
- Rhochmopterum majus Bezzi, 1926

Synonyms
- Rhochmopterum munroi var. major Bezzi, 1926

Species of fly

Rhochmopterum majus is a species of tephritid or fruit flies in the genus Rhochmopterum of the family Tephritidae.

== Distribution ==
Zimbabwe, Namibia, South Africa.
