= Pararhabdochaeta brachycera =

Scientific classification
- Kingdom: Animalia
- Phylum: Arthropoda
- Class: Insecta
- Order: Diptera
- Family: Tephritidae
- Subfamily: Tephritinae
- Tribe: Schistopterini
- Genus: Pararhabdochaeta
- Species: P. brachycera

Binomial name
- Pararhabdochaeta brachycera (Hardy, 1974)

Synonyms
- Rhabdochaeta brachycera Hardy, 1974

Species of fly

Pararhabdochaeta brachycera is a species of tephritid or fruit flies in the genus Pararhabdochaeta of the family Tephritidae.

== Distribution ==
Philippines.
