= Rhochmopterum munroi =

Scientific classification
- Kingdom: Animalia
- Phylum: Arthropoda
- Class: Insecta
- Order: Diptera
- Family: Tephritidae
- Subfamily: Tephritinae
- Tribe: Schistopterini
- Genus: Rhochmopterum
- Species: R. munroi

Binomial name
- Rhochmopterum munroi Bezzi, 1924

Species of fly

Rhochmopterum munroi is a species of tephritid or fruit flies in the genus Rhochmopterum of the family Tephritidae.

== Distribution ==
Malawi, Zimbabwe, South Africa.
