= Dicheniotes katonae =

Scientific classification
- Kingdom: Animalia
- Phylum: Arthropoda
- Class: Insecta
- Order: Diptera
- Family: Tephritidae
- Subfamily: Tephritinae
- Tribe: Tephrellini
- Genus: Dicheniotes
- Species: D. katonae

Binomial name
- Dicheniotes katonae Bezzi, 1924

Synonyms
- Tephrella katonae Bezzi, 1924; Tephrella katonai Munro, 1935

Species of fly

Dicheniotes katonae is a species of tephritid or fruit flies in the genus Dicheniotes of the family Tephritidae. Named after the Hungarian zoologist, Kalman Kittenberger's pseudonym, Katona.

== Distribution ==
Kenya, Tanzania, South Africa.
