= Clematochaeta euopis =

Scientific classification
- Kingdom: Animalia
- Phylum: Arthropoda
- Class: Insecta
- Order: Diptera
- Family: Tephritidae
- Subfamily: Tephritinae
- Tribe: Schistopterini
- Genus: Clematochaeta
- Species: C. euopis

Binomial name
- Clematochaeta euopis Munro, 1957

Species of fly

Clematochaeta euopis is a species of tephritid or fruit flies in the genus Clematochaeta of the family Tephritidae.

== Distribution ==
Uganda.
