= Eutretosoma oculatum =

Scientific classification
- Kingdom: Animalia
- Phylum: Arthropoda
- Class: Insecta
- Order: Diptera
- Family: Tephritidae
- Subfamily: Tephritinae
- Tribe: Schistopterini
- Genus: Eutretosoma
- Species: E. oculatum

Binomial name
- Eutretosoma oculatum (Hendel, 1914)

Synonyms
- Eutreta oculata Hering, 1914

Species of fly

Eutretosoma oculata is a species of tephritid or fruit flies in the genus Eutretosoma of the family Tephritidae.

== Distribution ==
Mozambique.
