= Eutretosoma kovacsi =

Scientific classification
- Kingdom: Animalia
- Phylum: Arthropoda
- Class: Insecta
- Order: Diptera
- Family: Tephritidae
- Subfamily: Tephritinae
- Tribe: Schistopterini
- Genus: Eutretosoma
- Species: E. kovacsi

Binomial name
- Eutretosoma kovacsi (Hering, 1941)

Synonyms
- Perirhithrum kovacsi Hering, 1941

Species of fly

Eutretosoma kovacsi is a species of tephritid or fruit flies in the genus Eutretosoma of the family Tephritidae. It is endemic to Ethiopia.
