= Rhochmopterum seniorwhitei =

Scientific classification
- Kingdom: Animalia
- Phylum: Arthropoda
- Class: Insecta
- Order: Diptera
- Family: Tephritidae
- Subfamily: Tephritinae
- Tribe: Schistopterini
- Genus: Rhochmopterum
- Species: R. seniorwhitei

Binomial name
- Rhochmopterum seniorwhitei (Bezzi, 1926)

Synonyms
- Rhabdochaeta seniorwhitei Bezzi, 1926

Species of fly

Rhochmopterum seniorwhitei is a species of tephritid or fruit flies in the genus Rhochmopterum of the family Tephritidae.

== Distribution ==
Sri Lanka.
