= Bactropota woodi =

Scientific classification
- Kingdom: Animalia
- Phylum: Arthropoda
- Class: Insecta
- Order: Diptera
- Family: Tephritidae
- Subfamily: Tephritinae
- Tribe: Schistopterini
- Genus: Bactropota
- Species: B. woodi

Binomial name
- Bactropota woodi Bezzi, 1924

Species of fly

Bactropota woodi is a species of tephritid or fruit flies in the genus Bactropota of the family Tephritidae.

== Distribution ==
Angola, Malawi, Namibia.
