= Rhochmopterum centrale =

Scientific classification
- Kingdom: Animalia
- Phylum: Arthropoda
- Class: Insecta
- Order: Diptera
- Family: Tephritidae
- Subfamily: Tephritinae
- Tribe: Schistopterini
- Genus: Rhochmopterum
- Species: R. centrale

Binomial name
- Rhochmopterum centrale (Hendel, 1915)

Synonyms
- Rhabdochaeta centralis Hendel, 1915

Species of fly

Rhochmopterum centrale is a species of tephritid or fruit flies in the genus Rhochmopterum of the family Tephritidae.

== Distribution ==
Taiwan.
