= Rhochmopterum venustum =

Scientific classification
- Kingdom: Animalia
- Phylum: Arthropoda
- Class: Insecta
- Order: Diptera
- Family: Tephritidae
- Subfamily: Tephritinae
- Tribe: Schistopterini
- Genus: Rhochmopterum
- Species: R. venustum

Binomial name
- Rhochmopterum venustum (Meijere, 1914)

Synonyms
- Rhabdochaeta venusta Meijere, 1914

Species of fly

Rhochmopterum venustum is a species of tephritid fruit fly in the genus Rhochmopterum of the family Tephritidae.

== Distribution ==
Japan, Thailand and Vietnam southeast to New Guinea and Australia.
