= Rhabdochaeta multilineata =

Scientific classification
- Kingdom: Animalia
- Phylum: Arthropoda
- Class: Insecta
- Order: Diptera
- Family: Tephritidae
- Subfamily: Tephritinae
- Tribe: Schistopterini
- Genus: Rhabdochaeta
- Species: R. multilineata

Binomial name
- Rhabdochaeta multilineata Hering, 1941

Species of fly

Rhabdochaeta multilineata is a species of tephritid or fruit flies in the genus Rhabdochaeta of the family Tephritidae.

== Distribution ==
Thailand, Malaysia, Philippines, Indonesia.
