= Rhochmopterum neuropteripenne =

Scientific classification
- Kingdom: Animalia
- Phylum: Arthropoda
- Class: Insecta
- Order: Diptera
- Family: Tephritidae
- Subfamily: Tephritinae
- Tribe: Schistopterini
- Genus: Rhochmopterum
- Species: R. neuropteripenne

Binomial name
- Rhochmopterum neuropteripenne Speiser, 1910

Species of fly

Rhochmopterum neuropteripenne is a species of tephritid or fruit flies in the genus Rhochmopterum of the family Tephritidae.

== Distribution ==
Tanzania.
