= Rhabdochaeta crockeri =

Scientific classification
- Kingdom: Animalia
- Phylum: Arthropoda
- Class: Insecta
- Order: Diptera
- Family: Tephritidae
- Subfamily: Tephritinae
- Tribe: Schistopterini
- Genus: Rhabdochaeta
- Species: R. crockeri

Binomial name
- Rhabdochaeta crockeri Curran, 1936

Synonyms
- Rhabdochaeta cockeri Hardy, 1985

Species of fly

Rhabdochaeta crockeri is a species of tephritid or fruit flies in the genus Rhabdochaeta of the family Tephritidae.

== Distribution ==
Indonesia, Papua New Guinea, New Britain, Australia, Solomon Island.
