= Rhabdochaeta asteria =

Scientific classification
- Kingdom: Animalia
- Phylum: Arthropoda
- Class: Insecta
- Order: Diptera
- Family: Tephritidae
- Subfamily: Tephritinae
- Tribe: Schistopterini
- Genus: Rhabdochaeta
- Species: R. asteria

Binomial name
- Rhabdochaeta asteria Hendel, 1915

Species of insect

Rhabdochaeta asteria is a species of tephritid or fruit flies in the genus Rhabdochaeta of the family Tephritidae.

== Distribution ==
Japan, Taiwan, India to Vietnam, Philippines, Papua New Guinea.
