= Schistopterum ismayi =

Scientific classification
- Kingdom: Animalia
- Phylum: Arthropoda
- Class: Insecta
- Order: Diptera
- Family: Tephritidae
- Subfamily: Tephritinae
- Tribe: Schistopterini
- Genus: Schistopterum
- Species: S. ismayi

Binomial name
- Schistopterum ismayi Hardy, 1982

Species of fly

Schistopterum ismayi is a species of tephritid or fruit flies in the genus Schistopterum of the family Tephritidae.

== Distribution ==
New Guinea.
