= Rhabdochaeta neavei =

Scientific classification
- Kingdom: Animalia
- Phylum: Arthropoda
- Class: Insecta
- Order: Diptera
- Family: Tephritidae
- Subfamily: Tephritinae
- Tribe: Schistopterini
- Genus: Rhabdochaeta
- Species: R. neavei

Binomial name
- Rhabdochaeta neavei Bezzi, 1920

Species of fly

Rhabdochaeta neavei is a species of tephritid or fruit flies in the genus Rhabdochaeta of the family Tephritidae.

== Distribution ==
Malawi, Zimbabwe.
