= Clematochaeta pacifer =

Scientific classification
- Kingdom: Animalia
- Phylum: Arthropoda
- Clade: Pancrustacea
- Class: Insecta
- Order: Diptera
- Family: Tephritidae
- Subfamily: Tephritinae
- Tribe: Schistopterini
- Genus: Clematochaeta
- Species: C. pacifer

Binomial name
- Clematochaeta pacifer Munro, 1968

Species of fly

Clematochaeta pacifer is a species of tephritid or fruit flies in the genus Clematochaeta of the family Tephritidae.Clematochaeta pacifera belongs to the genus Clematochaeta, and the family Tephritidae.

== Distribution ==
Ethiopia.
