= Rhabdochaeta queenslandica =

Scientific classification
- Kingdom: Animalia
- Phylum: Arthropoda
- Clade: Pancrustacea
- Class: Insecta
- Order: Diptera
- Family: Tephritidae
- Subfamily: Tephritinae
- Tribe: Schistopterini
- Genus: Rhabdochaeta
- Species: R. queenslandica

Binomial name
- Rhabdochaeta queenslandica Hardy & Drew, 1996

Species of fly

Rhabdochaeta queenslandica is a species of tephritid or fruit flies in the genus Rhabdochaeta of the family Tephritidae.

== Distribution ==
Australia.
