= Cordylopteryx lesneae =

Scientific classification
- Kingdom: Animalia
- Phylum: Arthropoda
- Class: Insecta
- Order: Diptera
- Family: Tephritidae
- Subfamily: Tephritinae
- Tribe: Schistopterini
- Genus: Cordylopteryx
- Species: C. lesneae

Binomial name
- Cordylopteryx lesneae (Séguy, 1933)

Synonyms
- Perirhithrum lesneae Bezzi, 1924

Species of fly

Cordylopteryx lesneae is a species of tephritid or fruit flies in the genus Cordylopteryx of the family Tephritidae.

== Distribution ==
Mozambique, Zimbabwe.
