= Eutretosoma =

Scientific classification
- Kingdom: Animalia
- Phylum: Arthropoda
- Class: Insecta
- Order: Diptera
- Family: Tephritidae
- Subfamily: Tephritinae
- Tribe: Schistopterini
- Genus: Eutretosoma; Hendel, 1914

Type species
- Eutreta oculata Hendel, 1914

Genus of flies

Eutretosoma is a genus of tephritid or fruit flies in the family Tephritidae.

== Species ==
- Eutretosoma kovacsi (Hering, 1941)
- Eutretosoma marshalli Bezzi, 1924
- Eutretosoma oculatum (Hendel, 1914)
- Eutretosoma woodi Bezzi, 1924
