= Dicheniotes sexfissata =

Scientific classification
- Kingdom: Animalia
- Phylum: Arthropoda
- Class: Insecta
- Order: Diptera
- Family: Tephritidae
- Subfamily: Tephritinae
- Tribe: Tephrellini
- Genus: Dicheniotes
- Species: D. sexfissata

Binomial name
- Dicheniotes sexfissata (Becker, 1909)

Synonyms
- Aciura sexfissata Becker, 1909; Aciura sexfissata Becker, 1910

Species of fly

Dicheniotes sexfissata is a species of tephritid or fruit flies in the genus Dicheniotes of the family Tephritidae.

== Distribution ==
Kenya.
