= Dicheniotes turgens =

Scientific classification
- Kingdom: Animalia
- Phylum: Arthropoda
- Class: Insecta
- Order: Diptera
- Family: Tephritidae
- Subfamily: Tephritinae
- Tribe: Tephrellini
- Genus: Dicheniotes
- Species: D. turgens

Binomial name
- Dicheniotes turgens Munro, 1947

Synonyms
- Tephrella turgens Munro, 1947

Species of fly

Dicheniotes turgens is a species of tephritid or fruit flies in the genus Dicheniotes of the family Tephritidae.

== Distribution ==
Uganda.
