= Dicheniotes angulicornis =

Scientific classification
- Kingdom: Animalia
- Phylum: Arthropoda
- Class: Insecta
- Order: Diptera
- Family: Tephritidae
- Subfamily: Tephritinae
- Tribe: Tephrellini
- Genus: Dicheniotes
- Species: D. angulicornis

Binomial name
- Dicheniotes angulicornis (Hendel, 1931)

Synonyms
- Metasphenisca angulicornis Hendel, 1931

Species of fly

Dicheniotes angulicornis is a species of tephritid or fruit flies in the genus Dicheniotes of the family Tephritidae.

== Distribution ==
Sudan.
