= Dicheniotes =

Scientific classification
- Kingdom: Animalia
- Phylum: Arthropoda
- Class: Insecta
- Order: Diptera
- Family: Tephritidae
- Subfamily: Tephritinae
- Tribe: Tephrellini
- Genus: Dicheniotes; Munro, 1938

Type species
- Tephrella dispar Bezzi, 1924

Genus of flies

Dicheniotes is a genus of tephritid or fruit flies in the family Tephritidae.

== Species ==
- Dicheniotes acclivis Munro, 1947
- Dicheniotes aeneus (Munro, 1947)
- Dicheniotes alexina (Munro, 1947)
- Dicheniotes angulicornis (Hendel, 1931)
- Dicheniotes asmarensis (Munro, 1955)
- Dicheniotes dispar (Bezzi, 1924)
- Dicheniotes distigma (Bezzi, 1924)
- Dicheniotes enzoria (Munro, 1947)
- Dicheniotes erosa (Bezzi, 1924)
- Dicheniotes katonae (Bezzi, 1924)
- Dicheniotes multipunctatus Merz & Dawah, 2005
- Dicheniotes parviguttatus (Hering, 1952)
- Dicheniotes polyspila (Bezzi, 1924)
- Dicheniotes sexfissata (Becker, 1909)
- Dicheniotes sokotrensis (Hering, 1939)
- Dicheniotes tephronota (Bezzi, 1908)
- Dicheniotes ternarius (Loew, 1861)
- Dicheniotes turgens Munro, 1947
