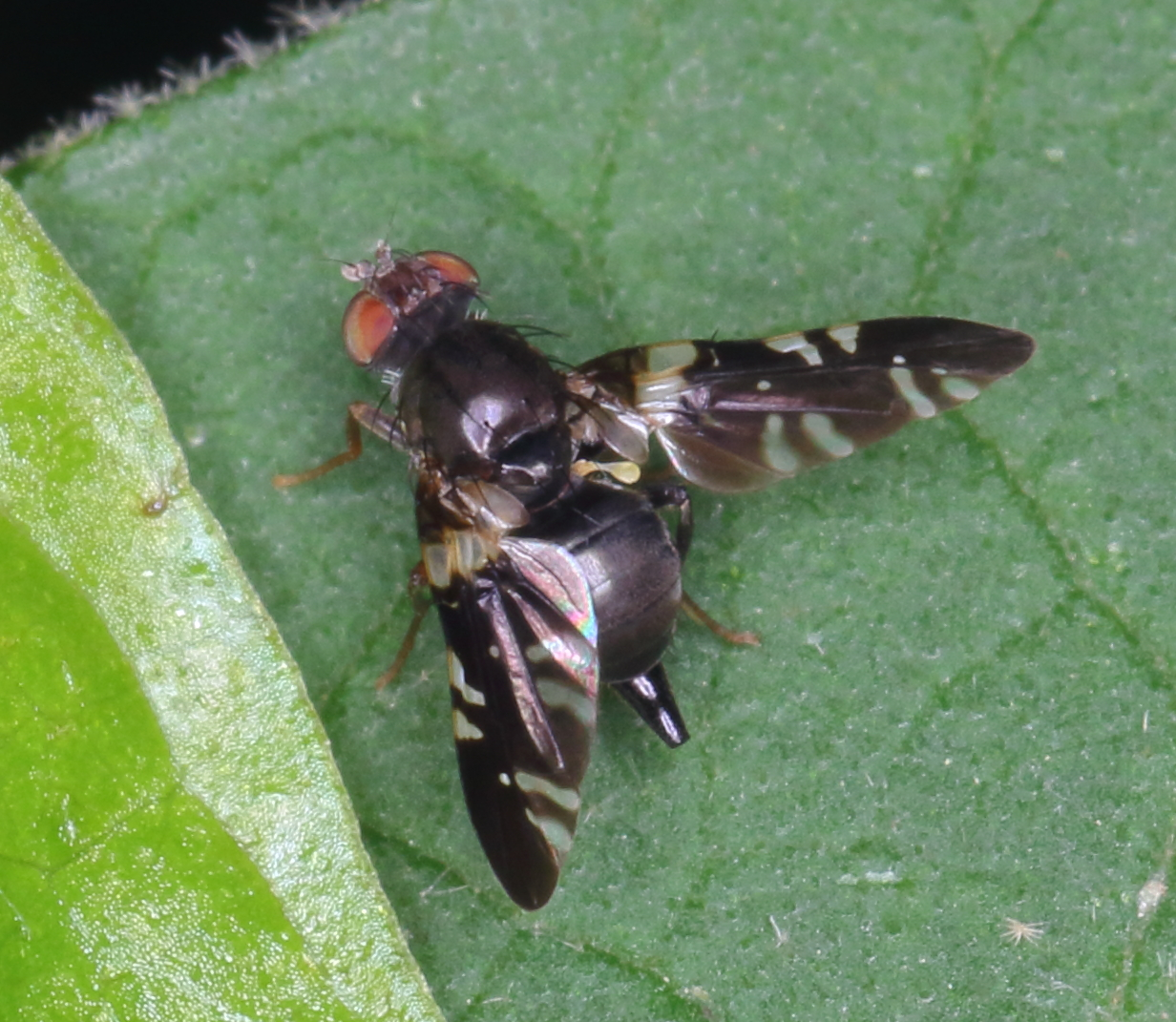

Scientific classification
- Kingdom: Animalia
- Phylum: Arthropoda
- Class: Insecta
- Order: Diptera
- Family: Tephritidae
- Subfamily: Tephritinae
- Tribe: Tephrellini
- Genus: Pediapelta
- Species: P. spadicescens

Binomial name
- Pediapelta spadicescens Munro, 1947

= Pediapelta spadicescens =

Species of fly

Pediapelta spadicescens is a species of tephritid or fruit fly in the family Tephritidae.

== Distribution ==
South Africa.
