= Cordylopteryx =

Scientific classification
- Kingdom: Animalia
- Phylum: Arthropoda
- Class: Insecta
- Order: Diptera
- Family: Tephritidae
- Subfamily: Tephritinae
- Tribe: Schistopterini
- Genus: Cordylopteryx; Hering, 1941

Type species
- Rhabdochaeta marshalli Bezzi, 1924

Genus of flies

Cordylopteryx is a genus of tephritid or fruit flies in the family Tephritidae.

== Species ==
- Cordylopteryx lesneae Séguy, 1933
- Cordylopteryx marshalli Bezzi, 1924
