= Katonaia aida =

Scientific classification
- Kingdom: Animalia
- Phylum: Arthropoda
- Class: Insecta
- Order: Diptera
- Family: Tephritidae
- Subfamily: Tephritinae
- Tribe: Tephrellini
- Genus: Katonaia
- Species: K. aida

Binomial name
- Katonaia aida Hering, 1938

Synonyms
- Siticola theodori Hering, 1953

Species of fly

Katonaia aida is a species of tephritid or fruit flies in the genus Katonaia of the family Tephritidae.

== Distribution ==
Israel, Egypt.
