= Heringomyia =

Scientific classification
- Kingdom: Animalia
- Phylum: Arthropoda
- Class: Insecta
- Order: Diptera
- Family: Tephritidae
- Subfamily: Tephritinae
- Tribe: Schistopterini
- Genus: Heringomyia; Hendel, 1968

Type species
- Rhochmopterum fordianum Munro, 1935

Synonyms
- Cladotricha Hering, 1940 (unavailable)

Genus of flies

Heringomyia is a genus of tephritid or fruit flies in the family Tephritidae.

== Species ==
- Heringomyia albipilosa (Hering, 1940)
- Heringomyia fordianum (Munro, 1935)
- Heringomyia zernyana (Hering, 1941)
