= Bactropota =

Scientific classification
- Kingdom: Animalia
- Phylum: Arthropoda
- Clade: Pancrustacea
- Class: Insecta
- Order: Diptera
- Family: Tephritidae
- Subfamily: Tephritinae
- Tribe: Schistopterini
- Genus: Bactropota; Bezzi, 1924

Type species
- Bactropota woodi Bezzi, 1924

Genus of flies

Bactropota is a genus of tephritid or fruit flies in the family Tephritidae.

== Species ==
- Bactropota woodi Bezzi, 1924
