= Pachyonomastus =

Scientific classification
- Kingdom: Animalia
- Phylum: Arthropoda
- Subphylum: Chelicerata
- Class: Arachnida
- Order: Araneae
- Infraorder: Araneomorphae
- Family: Salticidae
- Genus: Pachyonomastus; Caporiacco, 1947
- Species: P. kittenbergeri

Binomial name
- Pachyonomastus kittenbergeri Caporiacco, 1947

Genus of spiders

Pachyonomastus is a monotypic genus of East African jumping spiders containing the single species, Pachyonomastus kittenbergeri. It was first described by Lodovico di Caporiacco in 1947, and is only found in Africa. The name is a combination of the Ancient Greek παχύς ("pachys"), meaning "thick", and the related genus Onomastus. The species is named in honor of Kálmán Kittenberger, who collected the species.
