= Dicheniotes dispar =

Scientific classification
- Kingdom: Animalia
- Phylum: Arthropoda
- Class: Insecta
- Order: Diptera
- Family: Tephritidae
- Subfamily: Tephritinae
- Tribe: Tephrellini
- Genus: Dicheniotes
- Species: D. dispar

Binomial name
- Dicheniotes dispar Bezzi, 1924

Synonyms
- Tephrella dispar Bezzi, 1924

Species of fly

Dicheniotes dispar is a species of tephritid or fruit flies in the genus Dicheniotes of the family Tephritidae.

== Distribution ==
South Africa.
