= Clematochaeta =

Scientific classification
- Kingdom: Animalia
- Phylum: Arthropoda
- Class: Insecta
- Order: Diptera
- Family: Tephritidae
- Subfamily: Tephritinae
- Tribe: Schistopterini
- Genus: Clematochaeta; Hering, 1941

Type species
- Euribia perpallida Bezzi, 1918

Genus of flies

Clematochaeta is a genus of tephritid or fruit flies in the family Tephritidae.

== Species ==
- Clematochaeta acrophthalma (Bezzi, 1918)
- Clematochaeta discipulchra (Bezzi, 1918)
- Clematochaeta euopis Munro, 1957
- Clematochaeta pacifer Munro, 1968
- Clematochaeta perpallida (Bezzi, 1918)
