= Pararhabdochaeta =

Scientific classification
- Kingdom: Animalia
- Phylum: Arthropoda
- Class: Insecta
- Order: Diptera
- Family: Tephritidae
- Subfamily: Tephritinae
- Tribe: Schistopterini
- Genus: Pararhabdochaeta; Hardy, 1985

Type species
- Rhabdochaeta convergens Hardy, 1974

Genus of flies

Pararhabdochaeta is a genus of tephritid or fruit flies in the family Tephritidae.

== Species ==
- Pararhabdochaeta albolineata Hardy, 1985
- Pararhabdochaeta brachycera (Hardy, 1974)
- Pararhabdochaeta convergens (Hardy, 1974)
