= Schistopterum =

Scientific classification
- Domain: Eukaryota
- Kingdom: Animalia
- Phylum: Arthropoda
- Class: Insecta
- Order: Diptera
- Family: Tephritidae
- Subfamily: Tephritinae
- Tribe: Schistopterini
- Genus: Schistopterum; Becker, 1902

Type species
- Schistopterum moebiusi Becker, 1902

Genus of flies

Schistopterum is a genus of tephritid or fruit flies in the family Tephritidae.

== Species ==
- Schistopterum ismayi Hardy, 1982
- Schistopterum longulum Munro, 1937
- Schistopterum moebiusi Becker, 1903
