= Dicheniotes enzoria =

Scientific classification
- Kingdom: Animalia
- Phylum: Arthropoda
- Class: Insecta
- Order: Diptera
- Family: Tephritidae
- Subfamily: Tephritinae
- Tribe: Tephrellini
- Genus: Dicheniotes
- Species: D. enzoria

Binomial name
- Dicheniotes enzoria (Munro, 1947)

Synonyms
- Pediapelta enzoria Munro, 1947

Species of fly

Dicheniotes enzoria is a species of tephritid or fruit flies (Tephritidae); it was previously placed in the genus Pediapelta.

== Distribution ==
Uganda.
