= Katonaia arushae =

Scientific classification
- Kingdom: Animalia
- Phylum: Arthropoda
- Class: Insecta
- Order: Diptera
- Family: Tephritidae
- Subfamily: Tephritinae
- Tribe: Tephrellini
- Genus: Katonaia
- Species: K. arushae

Binomial name
- Katonaia arushae Munro, 1935

Species of fly

Katonaia arushae is a species of tephritid or fruit flies in the genus Katonaia of the family Tephritidae.

== Distribution ==
Kenya, Tanzania, Ethiopia.
