= Katonaia =

Scientific classification
- Kingdom: Animalia
- Phylum: Arthropoda
- Class: Insecta
- Order: Diptera
- Family: Tephritidae
- Subfamily: Tephritinae
- Tribe: Tephrellini
- Genus: Katonaia; Munro, 1935

Type species
- Katonaia arushae Munro, 1935

Synonyms
- Siticola Hering, 1947

Genus of flies

Katonaia is a genus of tephritid or fruit flies in the family Tephritidae. Named after the Hungarian zoologist, Kalman Kittenberger's pseudonym, Katona.

== Species ==
- Katonaia aida Hering, 1938
- Katonaia arushae Munro, 1935
- Katonaia hemileopsis (Hering, 1947)
