= Dicheniotes distigma =

Scientific classification
- Kingdom: Animalia
- Phylum: Arthropoda
- Class: Insecta
- Order: Diptera
- Family: Tephritidae
- Subfamily: Tephritinae
- Tribe: Tephrellini
- Genus: Dicheniotes
- Species: D. distigma

Binomial name
- Dicheniotes distigma Bezzi, 1924

Synonyms
- Tephrella distigma Bezzi, 1924; Brachyaciura discoguttata Hering, 1941

Species of fly

Dicheniotes distigma is a species of tephritid or fruit flies in the genus Dicheniotes of the family Tephritidae.

== Distribution ==
Tanzania, Zimbabwe, Namibia, South Africa.
