= Rhochmopterum =

Scientific classification
- Kingdom: Animalia
- Phylum: Arthropoda
- Class: Insecta
- Order: Diptera
- Family: Tephritidae
- Subfamily: Tephritinae
- Tribe: Schistopterini
- Genus: Rhochmopterum; Speiser, 1910

Type species
- Rhochmopterum neuropteripenne Speiser, 1910

Genus of flies

Rhochmopterum is a genus of tephritid or fruit flies in the family Tephritidae.

== Species ==
- Rhochmopterum antineura (Munro, 1935)
- Rhochmopterum arcoides Munro, 1935
- Rhochmopterum centrale (Hendel, 1915)
- Rhochmopterum hirsutum Séguy, 1933
- Rhochmopterum majus Bezzi, 1926
- Rhochmopterum melanurum (Bezzi, 1926)
- Rhochmopterum munroi Bezzi, 1924
- Rhochmopterum neuropteripenne Speiser, 1910
- Rhochmopterum parva (Hardy, 1974)
- Rhochmopterum pygmaeum Munro, 1935
- Rhochmopterum seniorwhitei (Bezzi, 1926)
- Rhochmopterum tribullosum (Hering, 1940)
- Rhochmopterum venustum (Meijere, 1914)
