= Rhabdochaeta =

Scientific classification
- Kingdom: Animalia
- Phylum: Arthropoda
- Class: Insecta
- Order: Diptera
- Family: Tephritidae
- Subfamily: Tephritinae
- Tribe: Schistopterini
- Genus: Rhabdochaeta; Meijere, 1904

Type species
- Rhabdochaeta pulchella Meijere, 1904

Genus of flies

Rhabdochaeta is a genus of tephritid or fruit flies in the family Tephritidae.

== Species ==
- Rhabdochaeta advena Hering, 1942
- Rhabdochaeta affinis Zia, 1939
- Rhabdochaeta ampla Hardy, 1973
- Rhabdochaeta asteria Hendel, 1915
- Rhabdochaeta crockeri Curran, 1936
- Rhabdochaeta formosana Shiraki, 1933
- Rhabdochaeta gladifera Hering, 1941
- Rhabdochaeta guamae Malloch, 1942
- Rhabdochaeta lutescens (Bezzi, 1924)
- Rhabdochaeta multilineata Hering, 1941
- Rhabdochaeta naevia Ito, 1984
- Rhabdochaeta neavei Bezzi, 1920
- Rhabdochaeta nigra Bezzi, 1924
- Rhabdochaeta obsoleta Bezzi, 1924
- Rhabdochaeta pluscula Hardy, 1970
- Rhabdochaeta pulchella Meijere, 1904
- Rhabdochaeta queenslandica Hardy & Drew, 1996
- Rhabdochaeta spinosa Lamb, 1914
- Rhabdochaeta subspinosa Bezzi, 1924
- Rhabdochaeta wedelia Hardy & Drew, 1996
