= Katonaia hemileopsis =

Scientific classification
- Kingdom: Animalia
- Phylum: Arthropoda
- Class: Insecta
- Order: Diptera
- Family: Tephritidae
- Subfamily: Tephritinae
- Tribe: Tephrellini
- Genus: Katonaia
- Species: K. hemileopsis

Binomial name
- Katonaia hemileopsis Hering, 1947

Synonyms
- Siticola hemileopsis Hering, 1947

Species of fly

Katonaia hemileopsis is a species of tephritid or fruit flies in the genus Katonaia of the family Tephritidae.

== Distribution ==
Greece.
