= Dicheniotes erosa =

Scientific classification
- Kingdom: Animalia
- Phylum: Arthropoda
- Class: Insecta
- Order: Diptera
- Family: Tephritidae
- Subfamily: Tephritinae
- Tribe: Tephrellini
- Genus: Dicheniotes
- Species: D. erosa

Binomial name
- Dicheniotes erosa Bezzi, 1924

Synonyms
- Tephrella erosa Bezzi, 1924

Species of fly

Dicheniotes erosa is a species of tephritid or fruit flies in the genus Dicheniotes of the family Tephritidae.

== Distribution ==
Congo, Uganda, Kenya, Tanzania.
