= Dicheniotes ternarius =

Scientific classification
- Kingdom: Animalia
- Phylum: Arthropoda
- Clade: Pancrustacea
- Class: Insecta
- Order: Diptera
- Family: Tephritidae
- Subfamily: Tephritinae
- Tribe: Tephrellini
- Genus: Dicheniotes
- Species: D. ternarius

Binomial name
- Dicheniotes ternarius (Loew, 1861)

Synonyms
- Trypeta ternaria Loew, 1861; Pediapelta ternaria (Loew, 1861)

Species of fly

Dicheniotes ternarius is a species of tephritid or fruit flies (Tephritidae). It was previously placed in the genus Pediapelta.

== Distribution ==
Kenya, Zimbabwe, South Africa.
