= Dicheniotes aeneus =

Scientific classification
- Kingdom: Animalia
- Phylum: Arthropoda
- Class: Insecta
- Order: Diptera
- Family: Tephritidae
- Subfamily: Tephritinae
- Tribe: Tephrellini
- Genus: Dicheniotes
- Species: D. aeneus

Binomial name
- Dicheniotes aeneus (Munro, 1947)

Synonyms
- Pediapelta aenea Munro, 1947

Species of fly

Dicheniotes aeneus is a species of tephritid or fruit flies (Tephritidae).

== Distribution ==
Kenya, Tanzania.
