= Dicheniotes alexina =

Scientific classification
- Kingdom: Animalia
- Phylum: Arthropoda
- Class: Insecta
- Order: Diptera
- Family: Tephritidae
- Subfamily: Tephritinae
- Tribe: Tephrellini
- Genus: Dicheniotes
- Species: D. alexina

Binomial name
- Dicheniotes alexina (Munro, 1947)

Synonyms
- Pediapelta alexina Munro, 1947

Species of fly

Dicheniotes alexina is a species of tephritid or fruit flies (Tephritidae).

== Distribution ==
Zimbabwe.
