= Dicheniotes asmarensis =

Scientific classification
- Kingdom: Animalia
- Phylum: Arthropoda
- Class: Insecta
- Order: Diptera
- Family: Tephritidae
- Subfamily: Tephritinae
- Tribe: Tephrellini
- Genus: Dicheniotes
- Species: D. asmarensis

Binomial name
- Dicheniotes asmarensis (Munro, 1955)

Synonyms
- Pediapelta asmarensis Munro, 1955

Species of fly

Dicheniotes asmarensis is a species of tephritid or fruit flies (Tephritidae).

== Distribution ==
Eritrea.
