= Kálmán Kittenberger =

Austro-Hungarian scientist

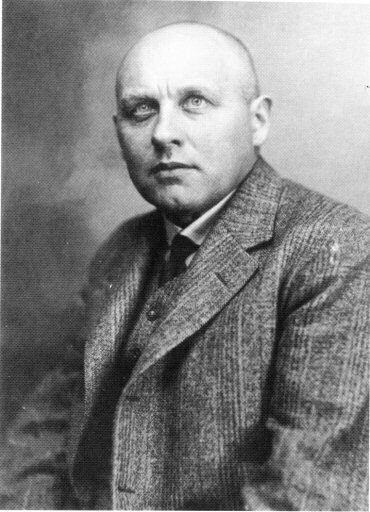
Kálmán Kittenberger in 1920

Kálmán Kittenberger (Léva, 10 October 1881 - Nagymaros, 4 January 1958) was an Austro-Hungarian traveller, natural historian, biologist and collector. He was born in Léva, now in Slovakia (Levice).

Kittenberger was born in a family with modest means. His father Imre Nándor Kittenberger was a shoemaker and his mother was Antónia Hangyási. He trained as a teacher in his hometown Léva and then in Budapest. While in Budapest he visited the National Museum regularly and learned the art of taxidermy. In 1902 he was forced to stop studies for pecuniary reasons and became a teacher in Tărlungeni. He received a letter from József Bársony to join an uncle Arzén Damaszkin into Africa and serve as a clerk. He however fell sick with malaria and was forced break journey to convalesce. He then travelled through Africa on his own. After this first visit in 1902, he made five other journeys to Africa. He collected specimens extensively for the Hungarian National Museum in Budapest. In 1904 he was nearly killed by a wounded lion and lost a finger on his right hand saving himself. He spent a total of 16 years in Africa on 6 occasions. During a hunting trip in British Uganda in 1914, he was captured by the British authorities, and taken to an internment camp in Ahmednagar, India; he was held there until the end of 1919. In 1919 he became editor of the magazine Nimrod and became its owner in 1925-26. He visited Africa again with his hunting friend Jenő Horthy. He married Lívia Kovács who was the sister of another hunting friend Ödön Kovács who died on a hunting trip to Ethiopia. He settled in a villa in Nagymaros.

During his journeys he faced financial difficulties as he received no sponsorship, but he was still able to grant 60,000 items to the biological collections of the Hungarian National Museum, including 300 new animal species (almost 40 of them were named after Kittenberger, including Pachyonomastus kittenbergeri). Part of that collection was annihilated by a fire in 1956. One museum altered his specimen labels to a pseudonym "Katona". Many of the taxonomic names dedicated to him are using this pseudonym e.g. Brachiopterna katonae or the genus Katonaia.

The Anthrenus kittenbergeri beetle is also named after him.

== Selected works ==
- Vadász- és gyűjtőúton Kelet-Afrikában (Hunting and collecting in East-Africa, 1927, Budapest)
- A megváltozott Afrika (Changed Africa, 1930, Budapest)
- Kelet-Afrika vadonjaiban (In the wilderness of East-Africa, 1955, Budapest)
- A Kilimandzsárótól Nagymarosig (From the Kilimanjaro to Nagymaros, 1956, Budapest)
- Vadászkalandok Afrikában (Hunting adventures in Africa, 1957, Budapest)
