= Schistopterini =

Scientific classification
- Kingdom: Animalia
- Phylum: Arthropoda
- Class: Insecta
- Order: Diptera
- Family: Tephritidae
- Subfamily: Tephritinae
- Tribe: Schistopterini

Tribe of flies

Schistopterini is a tribe of tephritid or fruit flies in the family Tephritidae.

== Genera ==
- Bactropota Bezzi, 1924
- Brachiopterna Bezzi, 1924
- Clematochaeta Hering, 1941
- Cordylopteryx Hering, 1941
- Eutretosoma Hendel, 1968
- Heringomyia Hendel, 1968
- Pararhabdochaeta Hardy, 1985
- Rhabdochaeta Meijere, 1904
- Rhochmopterum Speiser, 1910
- Schistopterum Becker, 1902
