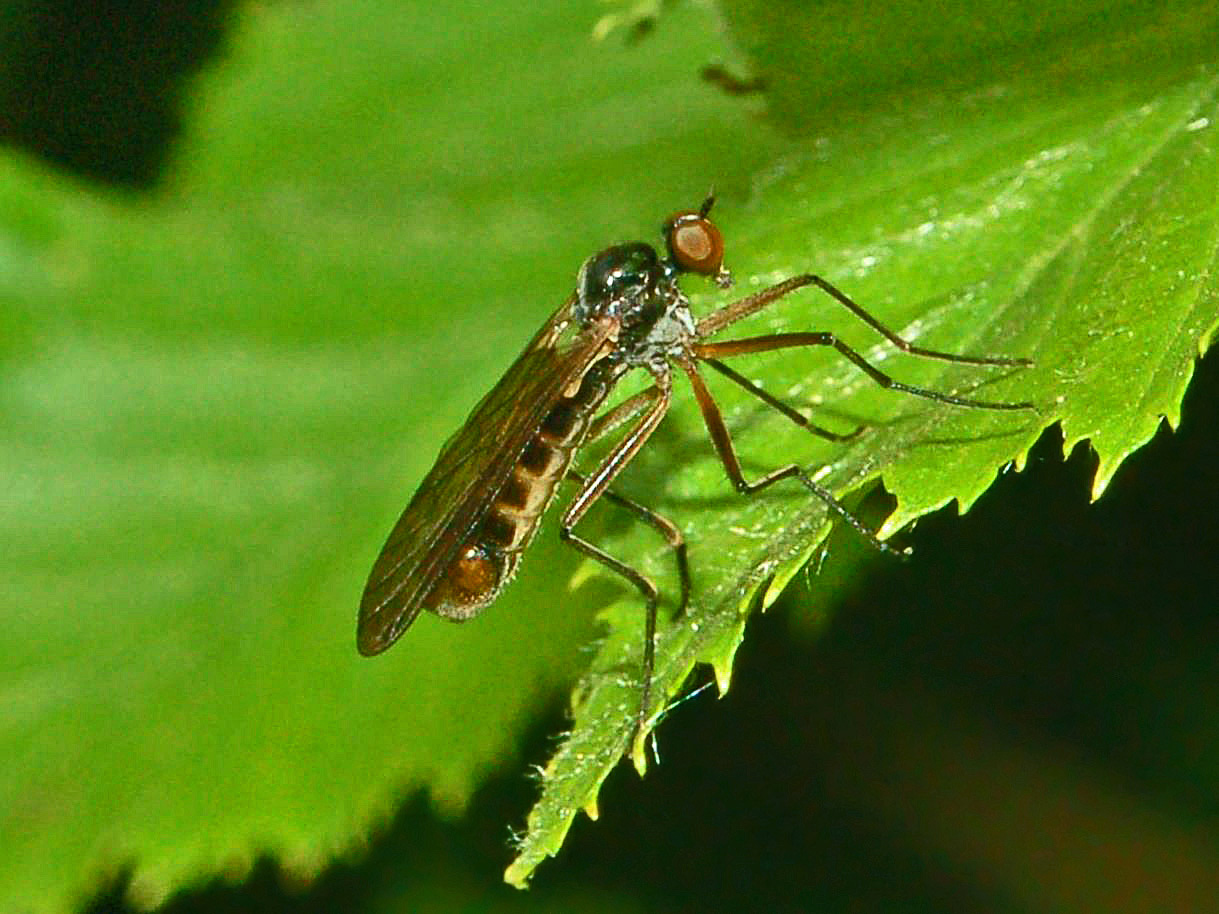
- Brachystoma sp.

Scientific classification
- Kingdom: Animalia
- Phylum: Arthropoda
- Class: Insecta
- Order: Diptera
- Family: Empididae
- Subfamily: Brachystomatinae; Melander, 1908

= Brachystomatinae =

Subfamily of flies

Brachystomatinae is a subfamily of flies belonging to the family Empididae.

== Taxonomy ==
Until 2006, Brachystomatinae was classified as a subfamily within Empididae, at which point a new phylogeny was proposed in which the lineage was raised to family rank, though other contemporaneous studies did not support this conclusion, and in 2018 a new analysis indicated that the treatment of Brachystomatinae as a family rendered Empididae paraphyletic, and restored it to the rank of subfamily.

== Genera ==
- Anomalempis Melander, 1928
- Apalocnemis Philippi, 1865
- Boreodromia Coquillett, 1903
- Brachystoma Meigen, 1822
- Ceratempis Melander, 1927
- Ceratomerus Philippi, 1865
- Ephydrempis Saigusa, 1986
- Gloma Meigen, 1822
- Glyphidopeza Sinclair, 1997
- Heleodromia Haliday, 1833
- Hyperperacera Collin, 1933
- Niphogenia Melander, 1928
- Pseudheleodromia Wagner, 2001
- Rubistella Garrett-Jones, 1940
- Sabroskyella Wilder, 1982
- Sematopoda Collin, 1928
- Sinotrichopeza Yang, Zhang & Zhang, 2007
- Trichopeza Rondani, 1856
- Xanthodromia Saigusa, 1986
- Zealandicesa Koçak & Kemal, 2010
