= Sphicosa globosa =

Scientific classification
- Kingdom: Animalia
- Phylum: Arthropoda
- Class: Insecta
- Order: Diptera
- Superfamily: Empidoidea
- Family: Empididae
- Subfamily: Empidinae
- Genus: Sphicosa
- Species: S. globosa

Binomial name
- Sphicosa globosa Smith, 1962

Species of fly

Sphicosa globosa is a species of dance flies, in the fly family Empididae.
