= Sphicosa coriacea =

Scientific classification
- Kingdom: Animalia
- Phylum: Arthropoda
- Class: Insecta
- Order: Diptera
- Superfamily: Empidoidea
- Family: Empididae
- Subfamily: Empidinae
- Genus: Sphicosa
- Species: S. coriacea

Binomial name
- Sphicosa coriacea (Bigot, 1889)

Synonyms
- Iteaphila coriacea Bigot, 1889

Species of fly

Sphicosa coriacea is a species of dance flies, in the fly family Empididae.
