= Thinempis austera =

Scientific classification
- Kingdom: Animalia
- Phylum: Arthropoda
- Class: Insecta
- Order: Diptera
- Superfamily: Empidoidea
- Family: Empididae
- Subfamily: Empidinae
- Genus: Thinempis
- Species: T. austera

Binomial name
- Thinempis austera Bickel, 1996

Species of fly

Thinempis austera is a species of dance flies, in the fly family Empididae.
