= Thinempis minuta =

Scientific classification
- Kingdom: Animalia
- Phylum: Arthropoda
- Class: Insecta
- Order: Diptera
- Superfamily: Empidoidea
- Family: Empididae
- Subfamily: Empidinae
- Genus: Thinempis
- Species: T. minuta

Binomial name
- Thinempis minuta Bickel, 1996

Species of fly

Thinempis minuta is a species of dance flies, in the fly family Empididae.
