= Thinempis esperance =

Scientific classification
- Kingdom: Animalia
- Phylum: Arthropoda
- Class: Insecta
- Order: Diptera
- Superfamily: Empidoidea
- Family: Empididae
- Subfamily: Empidinae
- Genus: Thinempis
- Species: T. esperance

Binomial name
- Thinempis esperance Bickel, 1996

Species of fly

Thinempis esperance is a species of dance flies, in the fly family Empididae.
