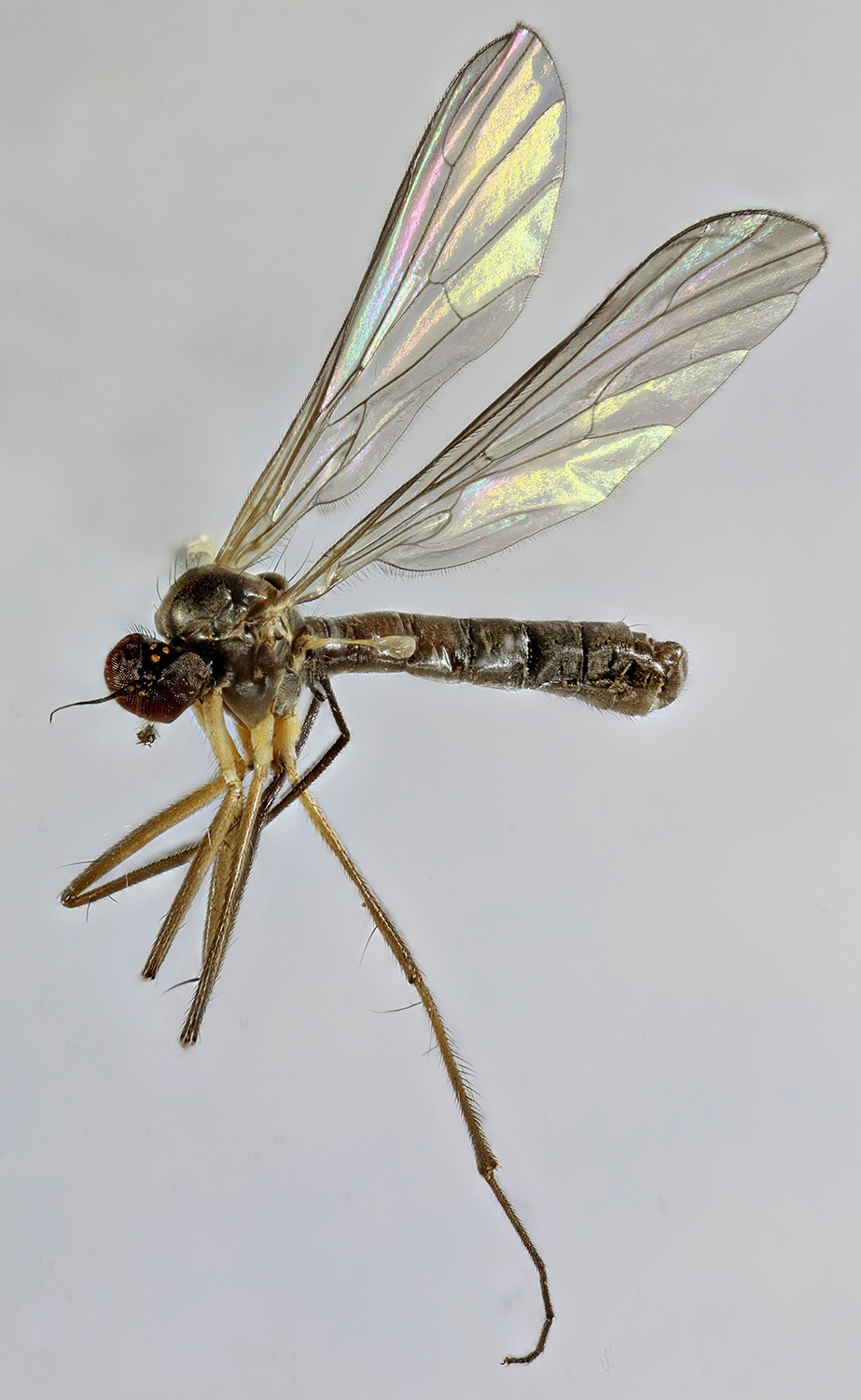
- Trichopeza longicornis North Wales

Scientific classification
- Kingdom: Animalia
- Phylum: Arthropoda
- Class: Insecta
- Order: Diptera
- Family: Empididae
- Genus: Trichopeza
- Species: T. longicornis

Binomial name
- Trichopeza longicornis (Meigen, 1822)

Synonyms
- Brachystoma longicornis Meigen, 1822

= Trichopeza longicornis =

Species of fly

Trichopeza longicornis is a Palearctic species of Empididae.
