= Sinotrichopeza =

Scientific classification
- Domain: Eukaryota
- Kingdom: Animalia
- Phylum: Arthropoda
- Class: Insecta
- Order: Diptera
- Family: Empididae
- Subfamily: Trichopezinae
- Genus: Sinotrichopeza; Yang, Zhang & Zhang, 2007

Type species
- Trichopeza sinensis Yang, Grootaert & Horvat, 2005

Genus of flies

Sinotrichopeza is a genus of flies in the family Empididae.

== Species ==
- S. sinensis (Yang, Grootaert & Horvat, 2005)
- S. taiwanensis (Yang & Horvat, 2006)
