= Hyperperacera =

Scientific classification
- Kingdom: Animalia
- Phylum: Arthropoda
- Class: Insecta
- Order: Diptera
- Family: Empididae
- Subfamily: Brachystomatinae
- Genus: Hyperperacera; Collin, 1933

Type species
- Brachystoma nemoralis Collin, 1933

Genus of flies

Hyperperacera is a genus of flies in the family Empididae.

== Species ==
- H. nemoralis (Philippi, 1865)
- H. philippii (Bigot, 1889)
