= Trichopeza albocincta =

Scientific classification
- Kingdom: Animalia
- Phylum: Arthropoda
- Class: Insecta
- Order: Diptera
- Family: Empididae
- Genus: Trichopeza
- Species: T. albocincta

Binomial name
- Trichopeza albocincta (Boheman, 1846)

Synonyms
- Brachystoma albocincta Boheman, 1846

Species of fly

Trichopeza albocincta is a European species of Empididae.
