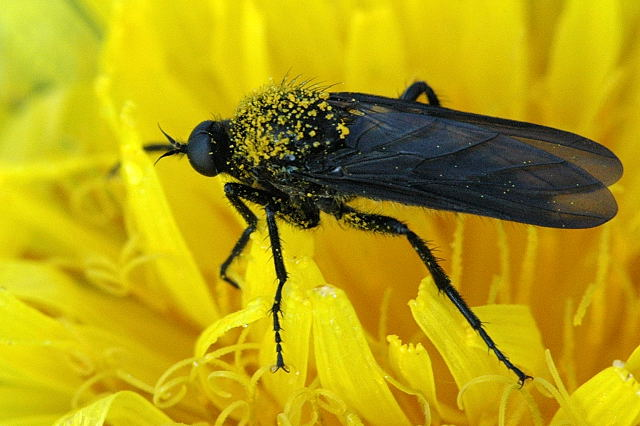
- Empis ciliata. Male
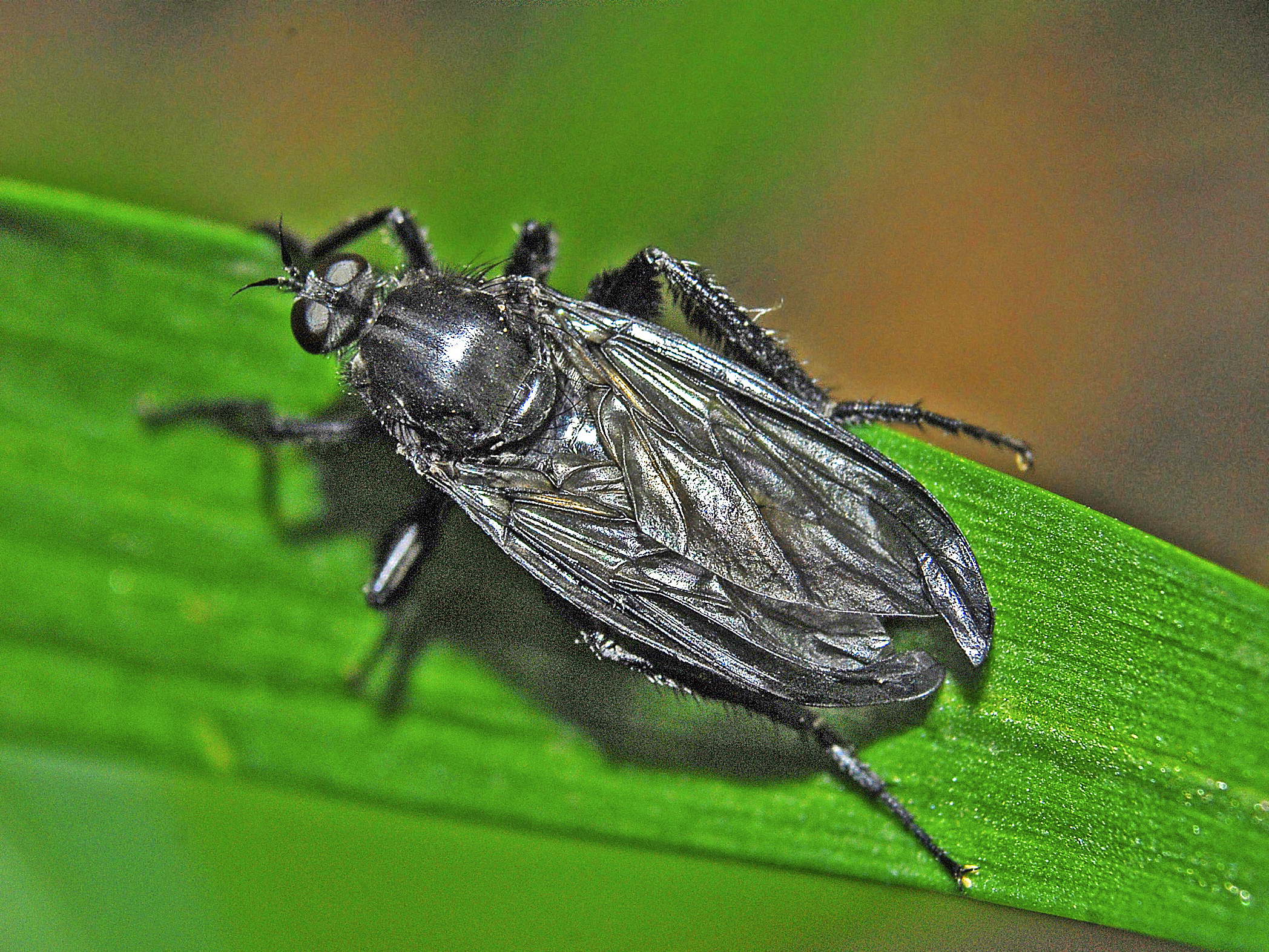

Scientific classification
- Kingdom: Animalia
- Phylum: Arthropoda
- Class: Insecta
- Order: Diptera
- Family: Empididae
- Genus: Empis
- Subgenus: Euempis
- Species: E. ciliata

Binomial name
- Empis ciliata Fabricius, 1787

Synonyms
- List: Empis (Euempis) ciliata Fabricius, 1787; Empis boja Schrank, 1803; Empis elongata Meigen, 1838; Empis laurata Villers, 1789

= Empis ciliata =

Species of fly

Empis ciliata, the black dance fly, is a species of dance fly, in the fly family Empididae. It is included in the subgenus Euempis.

== Distribution ==
This species can be found in western and southern Europe (Czech Republic, France, Germany, Italy, Spain, Switzerland, The Netherlands) and in the eastern Palearctic realm (Mongolia).

== Habitat ==
These flies mainly inhabit hedge rows, meadows and wet meadows, especially along the rivers.

== Description ==
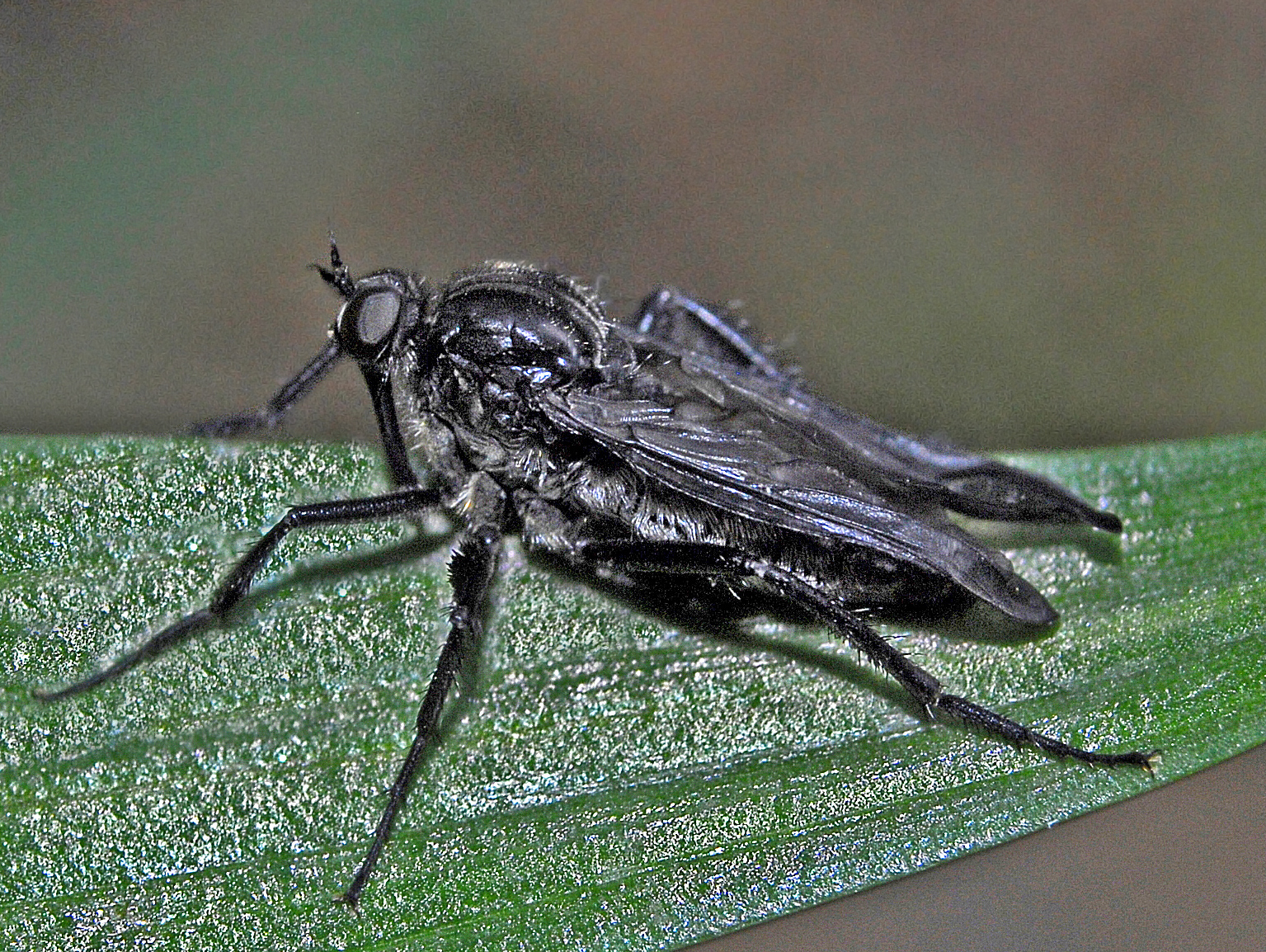
Side view

Empis ciliata can reach a length of 9.5–12.2 millimetres (0.37–0.48 in) in males, of 9–13 millimetres (0.35–0.51 in) in females. The wing length of males reaches 9–10.5 millimetres (0.35–0.41 in), while in females reach 9.3–11.5 millimetres (0.37–0.45 in).

These flies have shining black body, head, antennae and legs. Halteres are black and metapleural bristles are partly whitish. The base of the abdomen has whitish hairs. The legs are very hairy, with brush-like thighs especially in the females. The wings are long, robust, very dark brown or black. They have a long black sucking snout pointed downwards, used to suck their food.

This species is rather similar to Empis tessellata, but the latter is bigger and has brown-yellowish wings.

== Biology ==
Adults fly from May to June. They feed on other diptera and on sweet nectar from various flowers (Bellis perennis, Taraxacum campylodes, Alliaria petiolata, Aegopodium podagraria, Anthriscus sylvestris, Cardamine pratensis, Polygonum bistorta, Veronica chamaedrys, Menyanthes trifoliata, Crataegus). These commonly called dance flies usually can be seen in summertime during the day in large swarm. Before mating, the male catches a prey. The mating takes place while the female drains the prey. The larvae live in the soil and feed on insects.

== Gallery ==
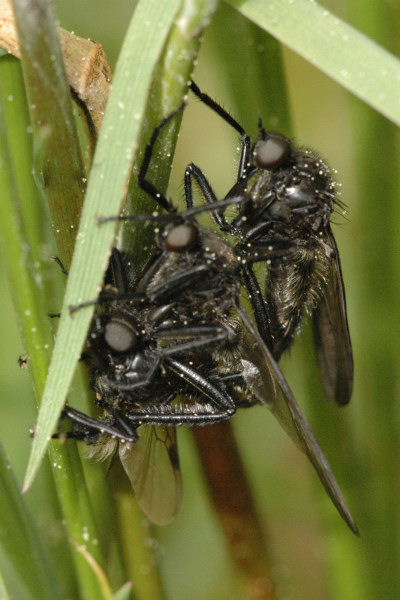
Empis ciliata. Couple

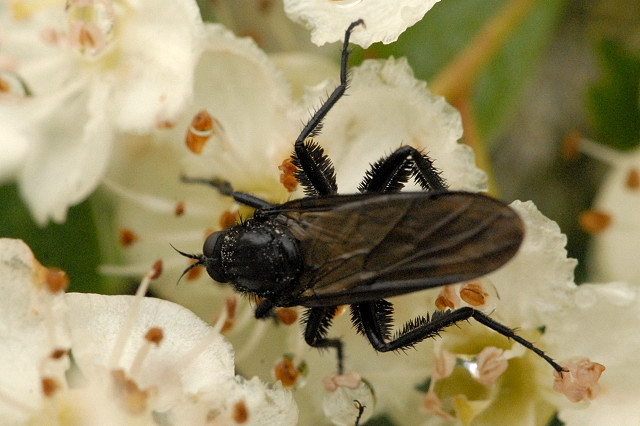
Dorsal view showing the very hairy legs

Video clip of Empis ciliata in copula

== Bibliography ==
- Joachim Haupt, Hiroko Haupt: Fliegen und Mücken. Beobachtung, Lebensweise. 1. Auflage. Naturbuch-Verlag, Jena und Stuttgart 1995, ISBN 3-89440-278-4.
- Collin, J.E. (1961). British Flies VI: Empididae Part 2: Hybotinae, Empidinae (except Hilara) 4. Cambridge: Cambridge UP. tr. 329.
- Chandler, Peter J. (1998). Checklists of Insects of the British Isles (New Series) Part 1: Diptera. Handbooks for the Identification of British Insects. New Series 12 (1) (London: Royal Entomological Society of London). tr. 234. ISBN 0-901546-82-8
