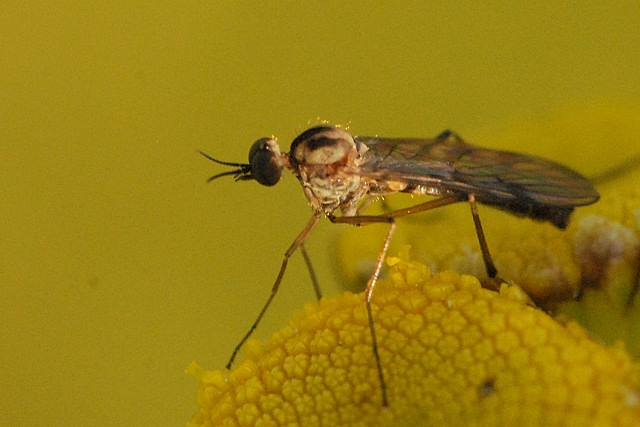
- Trichopeza longicornis

Scientific classification
- Kingdom: Animalia
- Phylum: Arthropoda
- Clade: Pancrustacea
- Class: Insecta
- Order: Diptera
- Family: Empididae
- Subfamily: Trichopezinae

= Trichopezinae =

Subfamily of flies

Trichopezinae are a subfamily of empidoid flies. They are mainly predatory flies like most of their relatives, and generally small to medium-sized, long-legged and large-eyed.

Previously, they were included in the Clinocerinae or the Hemerodromiinae. In some more recent treatments, the Brachystomatinae are considered a distinct family, and the Trichopezinae are placed therein. However, it is more likely that the Brachystomatinae are part of the Empididae, and that the Trichopezinae represent a separate lineage in the same family. The monophyly of the Trichopezinae versus its closest relatives is not firmly established; it seems likely that some changes will be necessary to make this subfamily a natural group.

== Selected genera ==
- Apalocnemis Philippi, 1865
- Boreodromia Coquillett, 1903
- Ceratempis Melander, 1927
- Ephydrempis Saigusa, 1986
- Gloma Meigen, 1822
- Heleodromia Haliday, 1833
- Heterophlebus Philippi, 1865
- Niphogenia Melander, 1928
- Pseudheleodromia Wagner, 2001
- Rubistella Garrett-Jones, 1940
- Sabroskyella Wilder, 1982
- Sematopoda Collin, 1928
- Trichopeza Rondani, 1856
