= Clinorhampha merita =

Scientific classification
- Kingdom: Animalia
- Phylum: Arthropoda
- Class: Insecta
- Order: Diptera
- Family: Empididae
- Genus: Clinorhampha
- Species: C. merita

Binomial name
- Clinorhampha merita Collin, 1933

Species of fly

Clinorhampha merita is a species of dance flies, in the fly family Empididae.
