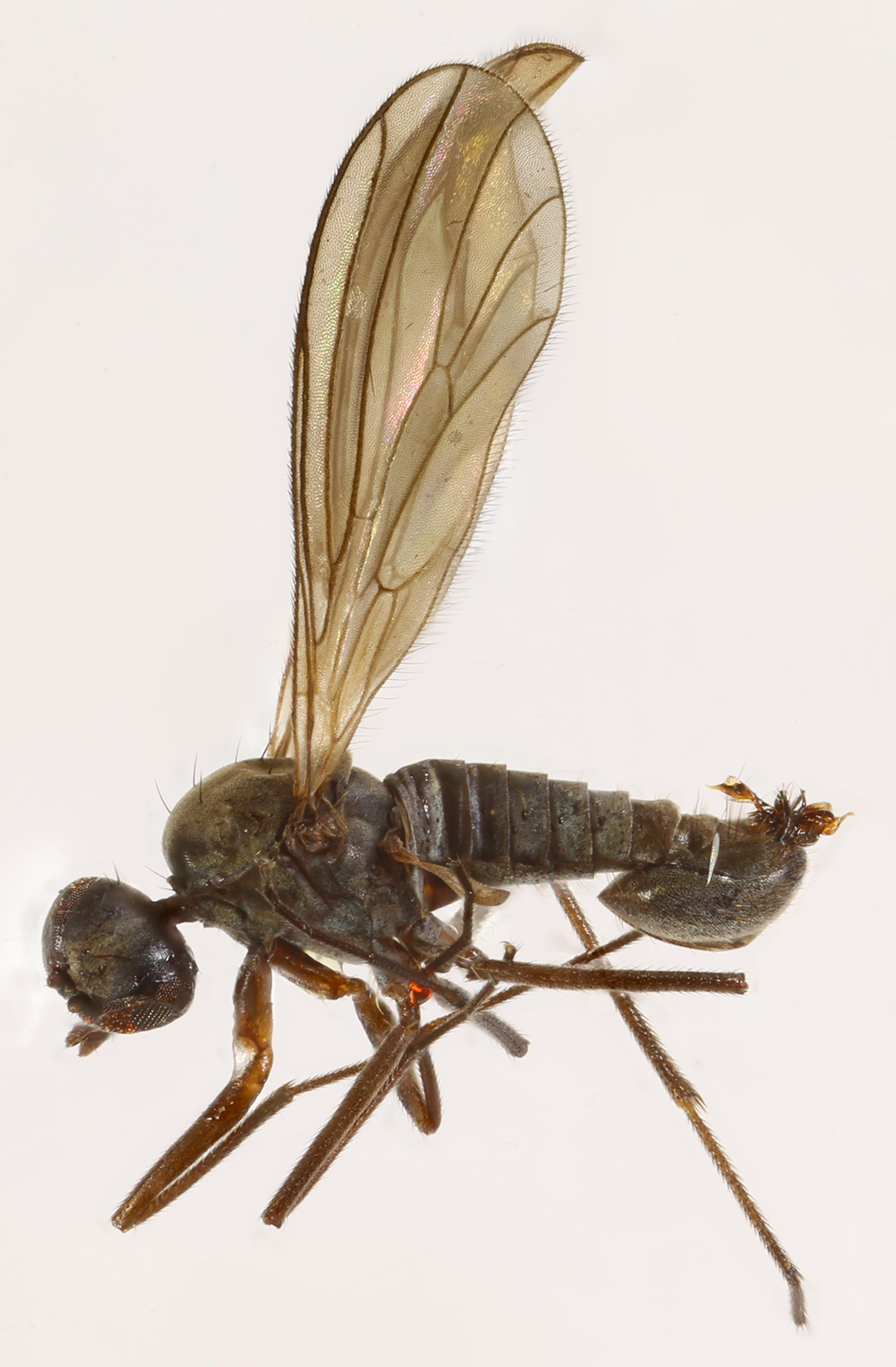
- Heleodromia immaculata North Wales

Scientific classification
- Kingdom: Animalia
- Phylum: Arthropoda
- Clade: Pancrustacea
- Class: Insecta
- Order: Diptera
- Family: Empididae
- Genus: Heleodromia
- Species: H. immaculata

Binomial name
- Heleodromia immaculata Haliday, 1833

= Heleodromia immaculata =

Species of fly

Heleodromia immaculata is a species of fly in the family Empididae. It is found in the Palearctic.
