= Thinempis =

Scientific classification
- Domain: Eukaryota
- Kingdom: Animalia
- Phylum: Arthropoda
- Class: Insecta
- Order: Diptera
- Family: Empididae
- Subfamily: Empidinae
- Genus: Thinempis; Bickel, 1996

Type species
- Thinempis austera Bickel, 1996

Genus of flies

Thinempis is a genus of flies in the family Empididae.

== Species ==
- T. austera Bickel, 1996
- T. esperance Bickel, 1996
- T. minuta Bickel, 1996
- T. takaka Bickel, 1996
- T. turimetta Bickel, 1996
