= Aplomera =

Scientific classification
- Kingdom: Animalia
- Phylum: Arthropoda
- Class: Insecta
- Order: Diptera
- Family: Empididae
- Subfamily: Empidinae
- Genus: Aplomera; Macquart, 1838

Type species
- Aplomera gayi Macquart, 1838

Synonyms
- Anodontina Macquart, 1838; Haplomera Agassiz, 1846

Genus of flies

Aplomera is a genus of flies in the family Empididae.

== Species ==
- A. brachystoma Philippi, 1865
- A. brevimana Collin, 1933
- A. chilensis Bezzi, 1909
- A. conspicua Collin, 1933
- A. dichroa Collin, 1933
- A. difficilis Collin, 1933
- A. gayi Macquart, 1838
- A. gymnopoda Bezzi, 1905
- A. lineata Collin, 1933
- A. macrocera Bigot, 1888
- A. medialis Collin, 1933
- A. notogramma Bezzi, 1905
- A. nudipes Macquart, 1838
- A. pachymera Macquart, 1838
- A. particularis Collin, 1933
- A. schrottkyi Bezzi, 1909
- A. spinulosa Philippi, 1865
- A. varasi Brèthes, 1916
