= Amictoides =

Scientific classification
- Kingdom: Animalia
- Phylum: Arthropoda
- Clade: Pancrustacea
- Class: Insecta
- Order: Diptera
- Family: Empididae
- Subfamily: Empidinae
- Genus: Amictoides; Bezzi, 1909

Type species
- Hilara breviventris Philippi, 1865

Genus of flies

Amictoides is a genus of flies in the family Empididae.

== Species ==
- A. poecilus (Philippi, 1865)
