= Lamprempis =

Scientific classification
- Domain: Eukaryota
- Kingdom: Animalia
- Phylum: Arthropoda
- Class: Insecta
- Order: Diptera
- Family: Empididae
- Subfamily: Empidinae
- Genus: Lamprempis; Wheeler & Melander, 1901

Type species
- Lamprempis chichimeca Wheeler & Melander, 1901

Genus of flies

Lamprempis is a genus of flies in the family Empididae.

== Species ==
- L. benigna (Osten Sacken, 1887)
- L. bezzii Smith, 1962
- L. boracea Smith, 1962
- L. calopoda Bezzi, 1905
- L. chichimeca Wheeler & Melander, 1901
- L. columbi (Schiner, 1868)
- L. cucama Smith, 1962
- L. cyanea (Bellardi, 1861)
- L. cyaneus (Bellardi, 1861)
- L. diaphorina (Osten Sacken, 1887)
- L. dolichopodina (Schiner, 1868)
- L. furcaticauda Smith, 1962
- L. gemmea Bezzi, 1905
- L. lindneri Engel, 1928
- L. meridionalis Engel, 1928
- L. sazimae Smith, 1975
- L. setigera Coquillett, 1903
- L. suavis (Loew, 1869)
- L. superba (Loew, 1861)
- L. truncatus Smith, 1962
- L. tuberifera Smith, 1962
- L. violacea (Loew, 1869)
- L. viridis (Coquillett, 1895)
