= Pasitrichotus =

Scientific classification
- Domain: Eukaryota
- Kingdom: Animalia
- Phylum: Arthropoda
- Class: Insecta
- Order: Diptera
- Family: Empididae
- Subfamily: Empidinae
- Genus: Pasitrichotus; Collin, 1933

Type species
- Pasitrichotus significans Collin, 1933

Genus of flies

Pasitrichotus is a genus of flies in the family Empididae.

== Species ==
- P. significans Collin, 1933
