= Trichohilara =

Scientific classification
- Domain: Eukaryota
- Kingdom: Animalia
- Phylum: Arthropoda
- Class: Insecta
- Order: Diptera
- Family: Empididae
- Subfamily: Empidinae
- Genus: Trichohilara; Collin, 1933

Type species
- Trichohilara metapleuralis Collin, 1933

Genus of flies

Trichohilara is a genus of flies in the family Empididae.

== Species ==
- T. metapleuralis Collin, 1933
