= Hystrichonotus =

Scientific classification
- Domain: Eukaryota
- Kingdom: Animalia
- Phylum: Arthropoda
- Class: Insecta
- Order: Diptera
- Family: Empididae
- Subfamily: Empidinae
- Genus: Hystrichonotus; Collin, 1933

Type species
- Hystrichonotus revelator Collin, 1933

Genus of flies

Hystrichonotus is a genus of flies in the family Empididae.

== Species ==
- H. revelator Collin, 1933
