= Clinorhampha =

Scientific classification
- Kingdom: Animalia
- Phylum: Arthropoda
- Clade: Pancrustacea
- Class: Insecta
- Order: Diptera
- Family: Empididae
- Subfamily: Empidinae
- Genus: Clinorhampha; Collin, 1933

Type species
- Clinorhampha merita Collin, 1933

Genus of flies

Clinorhampha is a genus of flies in the family Empididae.

== Species ==
- C. inevoluta Collin, 1933
- C. merita Collin, 1933
- C. necopinata Collin, 1933
