= Bandella =

Scientific classification
- Domain: Eukaryota
- Kingdom: Animalia
- Phylum: Arthropoda
- Class: Insecta
- Order: Diptera
- Family: Empididae
- Subfamily: Empidinae
- Genus: Bandella; Bickel, 2002

Type species
- Bandella allynensis Bickel, 2002

Genus of flies

Bandella is a genus of flies in the family Empididae.

== Species ==
- B. albitarsis Bickel, 2002
- B. allynensis Bickel, 2002
- B. cerra Bickel, 2002
- B. costalis Bickel, 2002
- B. duvalli Bickel, 2002
- B. maxi Bickel, 2002
- B. montana Bickel, 2002
- B. noorinbee Bickel, 2002
- B. tasmanica Bickel, 2002
