= Glyphidopeza =

Scientific classification
- Domain: Eukaryota
- Kingdom: Animalia
- Phylum: Arthropoda
- Class: Insecta
- Order: Diptera
- Family: Empididae
- Subfamily: Brachystomatinae
- Genus: Glyphidopeza; Sinclair, 1997

Type species
- Glyphidopeza fluviatlis Sinclair, 1997

Genus of flies

Glyphidopeza is a genus of flies in the family Empididae.

== Species ==
- G. fluviatlis Sinclair, 1997
- G. longicornis Sinclair, 1997
