= Allochrotus =

Scientific classification
- Domain: Eukaryota
- Kingdom: Animalia
- Phylum: Arthropoda
- Class: Insecta
- Order: Diptera
- Family: Empididae
- Subfamily: Empidinae
- Genus: Allochrotus; Collin, 1933

Type species
- Empis poecila Philippi, 1865

Genus of flies

Allochrotus is a genus of flies in the family Empididae.

== Species ==
- A. poecilus (Philippi, 1865)
