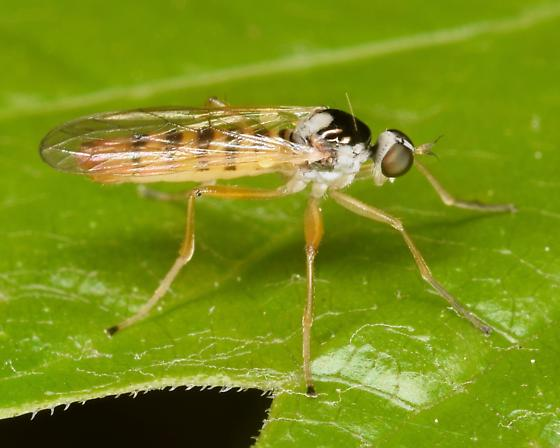
- Brachystoma robertsonii

Scientific classification
- Kingdom: Animalia
- Phylum: Arthropoda
- Class: Insecta
- Order: Diptera
- Family: Empididae
- Subfamily: Brachystomatinae
- Genus: Brachystoma; Meigen, 1822

Synonyms
- Brachistoma Rondani, 1856

= Brachystoma =

Genus of flies

Brachystoma is a genus of flies belonging to the family Empididae.

== Species ==
- B. aestivus (Scopoli, 1763)
- B. ambiguum (Philippi, 1865)
- B. apicale Smith, 1969
- B. bimaculatum Smith, 1969
- B. flavella Wagner & Andersen, 1995
- B. flavicolle Mik, 1887
- B. fuscipennis Saigusa, 1963
- B. jonesi Smith, 1969
- B. longirostris (Macquart, 1823)
- B. minuta (Olivier, 1791)
- B. mite (Jones, 1940)
- B. montanum Smith, 1969
- B. nigrimanum Loew, 1862
- B. obscuripes Loew, 1856
- B. occidentale Melander, 1902
- B. pectiniferum Smith, 1969
- B. pleurale Frey, 1956
- B. punctatus (Scopoli, 1763)
- B. pusillus (Scopoli, 1763)
- B. reflexiseta Smith, 1969
- B. robertsonii Coquillett, 1895
- B. serrulatum Loew, 1861
- B. setosus (Scopoli, 1763)
- B. simile Smith, 1969
- B. spinulosa Loew, 1850
- B. spinulosa Meunier, 1899
- B. submaculatum Smith, 1969
- B. takahashii Saigusa, 1963
- B. thoracicum (Philippi, 1865)
- B. truncatum Smith, 1969
- B. vesiculosum (Fabricius, 1794)
- B. vittigerum (Philippi, 1865)

== Distribution ==
Species of this genus are present in Austria, Croatia, France, Germany, Italy, Republic of Macedonia, Poland, Romania, Slovakia and Switzerland.
