= Afroempis =

Scientific classification
- Domain: Eukaryota
- Kingdom: Animalia
- Phylum: Arthropoda
- Class: Insecta
- Order: Diptera
- Family: Empididae
- Subfamily: Empidinae
- Genus: Afroempis; Smith, 1969

Type species
- Afroempis stuckenbergi Smith, 1969

Genus of flies

Afroempis is a genus of flies in the family Empididae.

== Species ==
- A. stuckenbergi Smith, 1969
