= Zealandicesa =

Scientific classification
- Domain: Eukaryota
- Kingdom: Animalia
- Phylum: Arthropoda
- Class: Insecta
- Order: Diptera
- Family: Empididae
- Subfamily: Brachystomatinae
- Genus: Zealandicesa; Koçak & Kemal, 2010

Type species
- Icasma singularis Collin, 1928

Synonyms
- Icasma Collin, 1928

Genus of flies

Zealandicesa is a genus of flies in the family Empididae.

== Species ==
- Z. aequabilis (Plant, 1991)
- Z. fascipennis (Sinclair, 1997)
- Z. longicauda (Sinclair, 1997)
- Z. masneri (Sinclair, 1997)
- Z. setosa (Sinclair, 1997)
- Z. singularis (Collin, 1928)
- Z. tararua (Sinclair, 1997)
