= Xanthodromia =

Scientific classification
- Domain: Eukaryota
- Kingdom: Animalia
- Phylum: Arthropoda
- Class: Insecta
- Order: Diptera
- Family: Empididae
- Subfamily: Brachystomatinae
- Genus: Xanthodromia; Saigusa, 1986

Type species
- Xanthodromia tenuicaudata Saigusa, 1986

Genus of flies

Xanthodromia is a genus of flies in the family Empididae.

== Species ==
- X. tenuicaudata Saigusa, 1986
