= Rhamphella =

Scientific classification
- Domain: Eukaryota
- Kingdom: Animalia
- Phylum: Arthropoda
- Class: Insecta
- Order: Diptera
- Family: Empididae
- Subfamily: Empidinae
- Genus: Rhamphella; Malloch, 1930

Type species
- Rhamphella inconspicua Malloch, 1930

Genus of flies

Porphyrochroa is a genus of flies in the family Empididae.

== Species ==
- R. inconspicua Malloch, 1930
