= Sphicosa =

Scientific classification
- Kingdom: Animalia
- Phylum: Arthropoda
- Class: Insecta
- Order: Diptera
- Family: Empididae
- Subfamily: Empidinae
- Genus: Sphicosa; Philippi, 1865

Type species
- Sphicosa nigra Philippi, 1865

Genus of flies

Sphicosa is a genus of flies in the family Empididae.

== Species ==
- S. albipennis Smith, 1962
- S. coriacea (Bigot, 1889)
- S. globosa Smith, 1962
- S. lecta Collin, 1933
- S. longirostris Smith, 1962
- S. nigra Philippi, 1865
- S. plaumanni Smith, 1962
- S. setipalpis Smith, 1962
- S. uniseta Smith, 1962
