= Sematopoda =

Scientific classification
- Domain: Eukaryota
- Kingdom: Animalia
- Phylum: Arthropoda
- Class: Insecta
- Order: Diptera
- Family: Empididae
- Subfamily: Trichopezinae
- Genus: Sematopoda; Collin, 1928

Type species
- Sematopoda elata Collin, 1928

Genus of flies

Sematopoda is a genus of flies in the family Empididae.

== Species ==
- S. elata Collin, 1928
