= Cunomyia =

Scientific classification
- Domain: Eukaryota
- Kingdom: Animalia
- Phylum: Arthropoda
- Class: Insecta
- Order: Diptera
- Family: Empididae
- Subfamily: Empidinae
- Genus: Cunomyia; Bickel, 1998

Genus of flies

Cunomyia is a genus of flies in the family Empididae from montane sites in western Tasmania, of which almost all of them are in the Tasmanian World Heritage Area.

First described in 1998 by Daniel Bickel in his paper, "Cunomyia, a distinctive new hilarine fly genus from the Tasmanian World Heritage Area", as being a monotypic genus only from Tasmania.

== Etymology ==
Cunomyia is a combination of the Latin "cuua", meaning cradle, and "myia", a Greek word meaning fly, referring to the type locality in Cradle Valley, Tasmania.

== Species ==
- C. unica Bickel, 1998
