= Atrichopleura =

Scientific classification
- Kingdom: Animalia
- Phylum: Arthropoda
- Clade: Pancrustacea
- Class: Insecta
- Order: Diptera
- Family: Empididae
- Subfamily: Empidinae
- Genus: Atrichopleura; Bezzi, 1909

Type species
- Atrichopleura schnusei Bezzi, 1909

Genus of flies

Atrichopleura is a genus of flies in the family Empididae.

== Species ==
- A. argyriventris Becker, 1919
- A. burchelli Smith, 1969
- A. caesia Collin, 1933
- A. cana Collin, 1933
- A. caudata Collin, 1933
- A. cinerea Collin, 1933
- A. citima Collin, 1933
- A. compitalis Collin, 1928
- A. congener Collin, 1933
- A. conjuncta Malloch, 1931
- A. crassa Bezzi, 1909
- A. enarrabilis Collin, 1933
- A. fausta Collin, 1933
- A. guarini Smith, 1962
- A. hirtipes Bezzi, 1909
- A. jaffueli Collin, 1933
- A. livingstonei Smith, 1969
- A. mameluca Smith, 1962
- A. mauhes Smith, 1962
- A. mundurucu Smith, 1962
- A. nitida Bezzi, 1909
- A. prothoracalis Collin, 1933
- A. scapulifera Bigot, 1889
- A. schinusei Bezzi, 1909
- A. spinipes Collin, 1933
- A. tephrodes Philippi, 1865
