= Anomalempis =

Scientific classification
- Domain: Eukaryota
- Kingdom: Animalia
- Phylum: Arthropoda
- Class: Insecta
- Order: Diptera
- Family: Empididae
- Subfamily: Brachystomatinae
- Genus: Anomalempis; Melander, 1928

Type species
- Anomalempis tacomae Melander, 1928

Genus of flies

Anomalempis is a genus of flies in the family Empididae.

== Species ==
- A. archon Melander, 1945
- A. tacomae Melander, 1928
