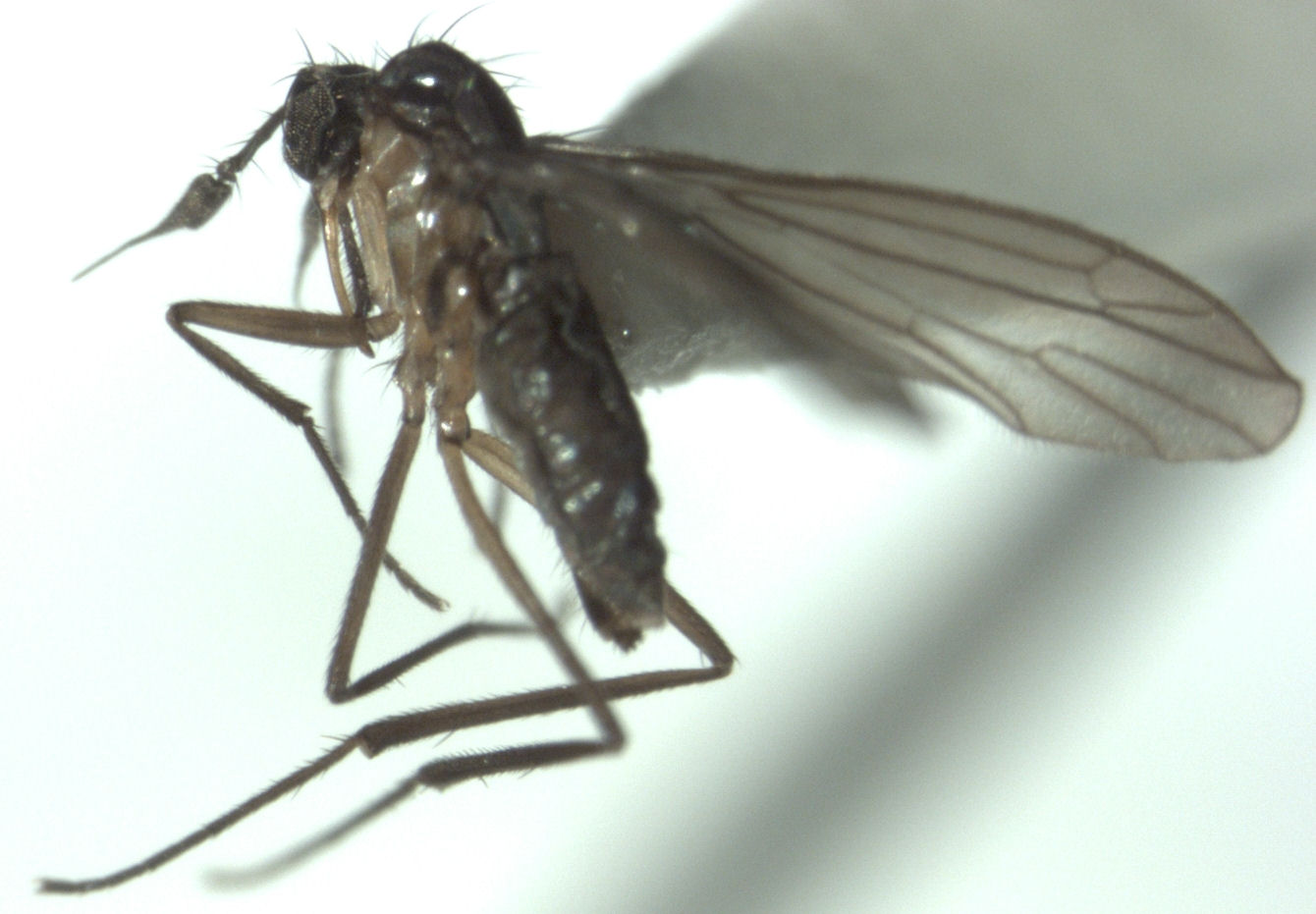
- Adult female Ceratomerus n.sp

Scientific classification
- Kingdom: Animalia
- Phylum: Arthropoda
- Clade: Pancrustacea
- Class: Insecta
- Order: Diptera
- Family: Empididae
- Subfamily: Brachystomatinae
- Genus: Ceratomerus; Philippi, 1865

Type species
- Ceratomerus paradoxus Philippi, 1865

Synonyms
- Tomia Paramonov, 1961

= Ceratomerus =

Genus of flies

Ceratomerus is a genus of flies in the family Empididae.

== Species ==
- C. albistylus Hardy, 1930
- C. athertonius Sinclair, 2003
- C. attenuatus Sinclair, 2003
- C. barringtonensis Sinclair, 2003
- C. bickeli Sinclair, 2003
- C. biseriatus Plant, 1991
- C. brevifurcatus Plant, 1991
- C. bulbosus Sinclair, 2003
- C. campbelli (Paramonov, 1961)
- C. campbelli (Paramonov, 1961)
- C. connexus Collin, 1933
- C. crassinervis Malloch, 1931
- C. deansi Plant, 1995
- C. dorsatus Collin, 1928
- C. earlyi Plant, 1991
- C. exiguus Collin, 1928
- C. falcatus Sinclair, 2003
- C. flavus Plant, 1991
- C. globosus Sinclair, 2003
- C. hibernus Sinclair, 2003
- C. inflexus Hardy, 1930
- C. lobatus Sinclair, 2003
- C. longifurcatus Collin, 1931
- C. macalpinei Sinclair, 2003
- C. maculatus Sinclair, 2003
- C. malleolus Sinclair, 2003
- C. mediocris Collin, 1933
- C. melaneus Plant, 1991
- C. ordinatus Hardy, 1930
- C. oreas Sinclair, 2003
- C. orientalis Sinclair, 2003
- C. paradoxus Philippi, 1865
- C. prodigiosus Collin, 1928
- C. tarsalis Plant, 1991
- C. tuberculus Hardy, 1930
- C. victoriae Sinclair, 2003
- C. virgatus Collin, 1928
- C. vittatus Plant, 1991
