= Hybomyia =

Scientific classification
- Domain: Eukaryota
- Kingdom: Animalia
- Phylum: Arthropoda
- Class: Insecta
- Order: Diptera
- Family: Empididae
- Subfamily: Empidinae
- Genus: Hybomyia; Plant, 1995

Type species
- Hybomyia oliveri Plant, 1995

Genus of flies

Hybomyia is a genus of flies in the family Empididae.

== Species ==
- H. oliveri Plant, 1995
