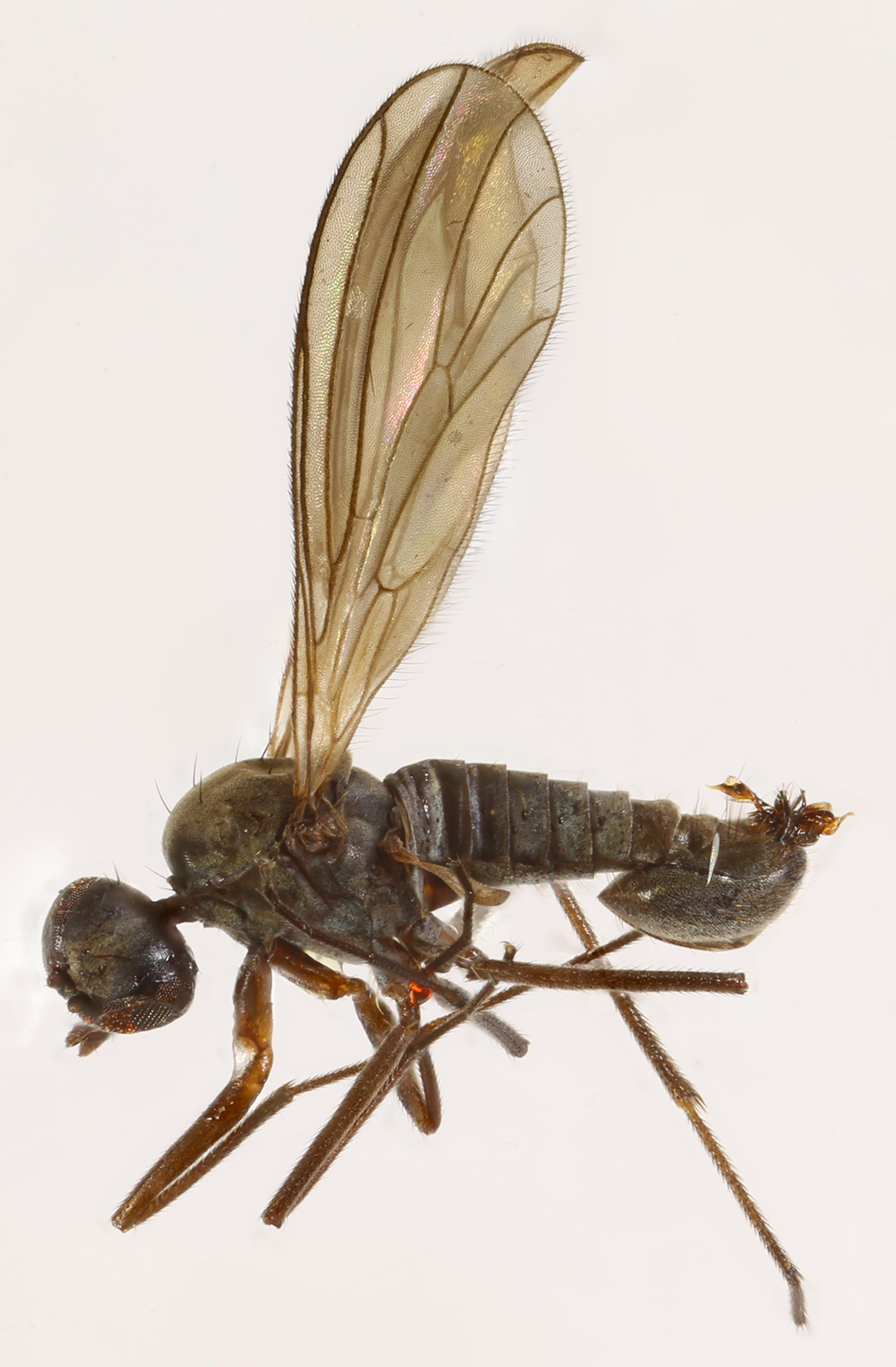
- Heleodromia immaculata North Wales

Scientific classification
- Kingdom: Animalia
- Phylum: Arthropoda
- Class: Insecta
- Order: Diptera
- Family: Empididae
- Subfamily: Trichopezinae
- Genus: Heleodromia; Haliday, 1833

Type species
- Heleodromia immaculata Haliday, 1833

Synonyms
- Illiesiella Wagner, 1985; Microcera Zetterstedt, 1838; Heleodromyia Bigot, 1889

= Heleodromia =

Genus of flies

Heleodromia is a genus of flies in the family Empididae.

== Species ==
- H. angulata Wagner, 2003
- H. ausobskyi Wagner, 1983
- H. baculifera Tokarczyk & Kovalev, 1986
- H. banatica Wagner, 1985
- H. boreoalpina Saigusa, 1963
- H. chillcotti Sinclair, 2012
- H. cranehollwensis Cumming & Coovert, 2012
- H. foveata Wagner, Hoffeins & Hoffeins, 2000
- H. haenii Wagner, 1996
- H. hilo Smith, 1965
- H. immaculata Haliday, 1833
- H. irwini Wagner, 1985
- H. japonica Saigusa, 1963
- H. macropyga Saigusa, 1963
- H. minutiformis Saigusa, 1963
- H. obscura (Brunetti, 1913)
- H. oldenbergi Wagner, 1985
- H. pectinulata (Strobl, 1898)
- H. pullata (Melander, 1902)
- H. rami Wagner, Leese & Panesar, 2004
- H. saigusae Joost, 1991
- H. schachti Wagner, 1985
- H. starki Hoffeins, Hoffeins & Wagner, 1997
- H. wagneri Niesiolowski, 1986
- H. woodi Brooks, 2012
