= Rubistella =

Scientific classification
- Kingdom: Animalia
- Phylum: Arthropoda
- Class: Insecta
- Order: Diptera
- Family: Empididae
- Subfamily: Trichopezinae
- Genus: Rubistella; Garrett Jones, 1940

Type species
- Rubistella mitis Garrett-Jones, 1940

Genus of flies

Rubistella is a genus of flies in the family Empididae.

== Species ==
- R. mitis Garrett-Jones, 1940
