= Apalocnemis =

Scientific classification
- Kingdom: Animalia
- Phylum: Arthropoda
- Class: Insecta
- Order: Diptera
- Family: Empididae
- Subfamily: Trichopezinae
- Genus: Apalocnemis; Philippi, 1865

Type species
- Apalocnemis obscura Philippi, 1865

Synonyms
- Timalphes Melander, 1928

Genus of flies

Apalocnemis is a genus of flies in the family Empididae.

== Species ==
- A. acuticornis (Loew, 1850)
- A. canadambris Grimaldi & Cumming, 1999
- A. cingulata Bezzi, 1909
- A. circumspinosa Collin, 1933
- A. discreta Collin, 1933
- A. distincta Collin, 1933
- A. echinata Collin, 1933
- A. elongata Collin, 1933
- A. fumosa (Hutton, 1901)
- A. fumosa (Hutton, 1901)
- A. gracilis (Meunier, 1908)
- A. gracilis (Meunier, 1908)
- A. halterata Becker, 1919
- A. halterata Collin, 1933
- A. hirsuta Melander, 1946
- A. holosericea Thomson, 1869
- A. indefinita Collin, 1933
- A. ingeniosa Collin, 1933
- A. innocua Collin, 1933
- A. intonsa Collin, 1933
- A. maura Collin, 1933
- A. mediocris Collin, 1933
- A. obscura Philippi, 1865
- A. ochracea Bigot, 1888
- A. oreas Melander, 1946
- A. palpata (Loew, 1850)
- A. philippii Smith, 1962
- A. plorator Collin, 1933
- A. racemata Collin, 1933
- A. rostrata Collin, 1933
- A. salesopolis Smith, 1962
- A. sanguinea Hardy, 1934
- A. simulans Collin, 1928
- A. solitaria Collin, 1933
- A. variegata Bezzi, 1905
- A. xanthogyna Collin, 1933
