= Pseudheleodromia =

Scientific classification
- Domain: Eukaryota
- Kingdom: Animalia
- Phylum: Arthropoda
- Class: Insecta
- Order: Diptera
- Family: Empididae
- Subfamily: Trichopezinae
- Genus: Pseudheleodromia; Wagner, 2001

Type species
- Pseudheleodromia helvetica Wagner, 2001

Synonyms
- Pseudoheleodromia Sinclair & Cumming, 2006

Genus of flies

Pseudheleodromia is a genus of flies in the family Empididae.

== Species ==
- P. helvetica Wagner, 2001
