= Niphogenia =

Scientific classification
- Domain: Eukaryota
- Kingdom: Animalia
- Phylum: Arthropoda
- Class: Insecta
- Order: Diptera
- Family: Empididae
- Subfamily: Brachystomatinae
- Genus: Niphogenia; Melander, 1928

Type species
- Niphogenia eucera Melander, 1928

Genus of flies

Niphogenia is a genus of flies in the family Empididae.

== Species ==
- N. eucera Melander, 1928
- N. turneri Wilder, 1981
