= Gloma =

Scientific classification
- Domain: Eukaryota
- Kingdom: Animalia
- Phylum: Arthropoda
- Class: Insecta
- Order: Diptera
- Family: Empididae
- Subfamily: Trichopezinae
- Genus: Gloma; Meigen, 1822

Type species
- Boreodromia fuscipennis Meigen, 1822

Genus of flies

Gloma is a genus of flies in the family Empididae.

== Species ==
- G. fuscipennis Meigen, 1822
- G. fuscipes Melander, 1945
- †G. hirta Loew, 1850
- G. luctuosa Melander, 1928
- G. pectinipes Melander, 1945
