= Boreodromia =

Scientific classification
- Domain: Eukaryota
- Kingdom: Animalia
- Phylum: Arthropoda
- Class: Insecta
- Order: Diptera
- Family: Empididae
- Subfamily: Trichopezinae
- Genus: Boreodromia; Coquillett, 1903

Type species
- Synamphotera bicolor Loew, 1863

Synonyms
- Boreomyia Coquillett, 1903; Boreomyia Aldrich, 1905

Genus of flies

Boreodromia is a genus of flies in the family Empididae.

== Species ==
- B. bicolor (Loew, 1863)
