= Sabroskyella =

Scientific classification
- Domain: Eukaryota
- Kingdom: Animalia
- Phylum: Arthropoda
- Class: Insecta
- Order: Diptera
- Family: Empididae
- Subfamily: Trichopezinae
- Genus: Sabroskyella; Wilder, 1982

Type species
- Sabroskyella rancheria Wilder, 1982

Genus of flies

Sabroskyella is a genus of flies in the family Empididae.

== Species ==
- S. rancheria Wilder, 1982
