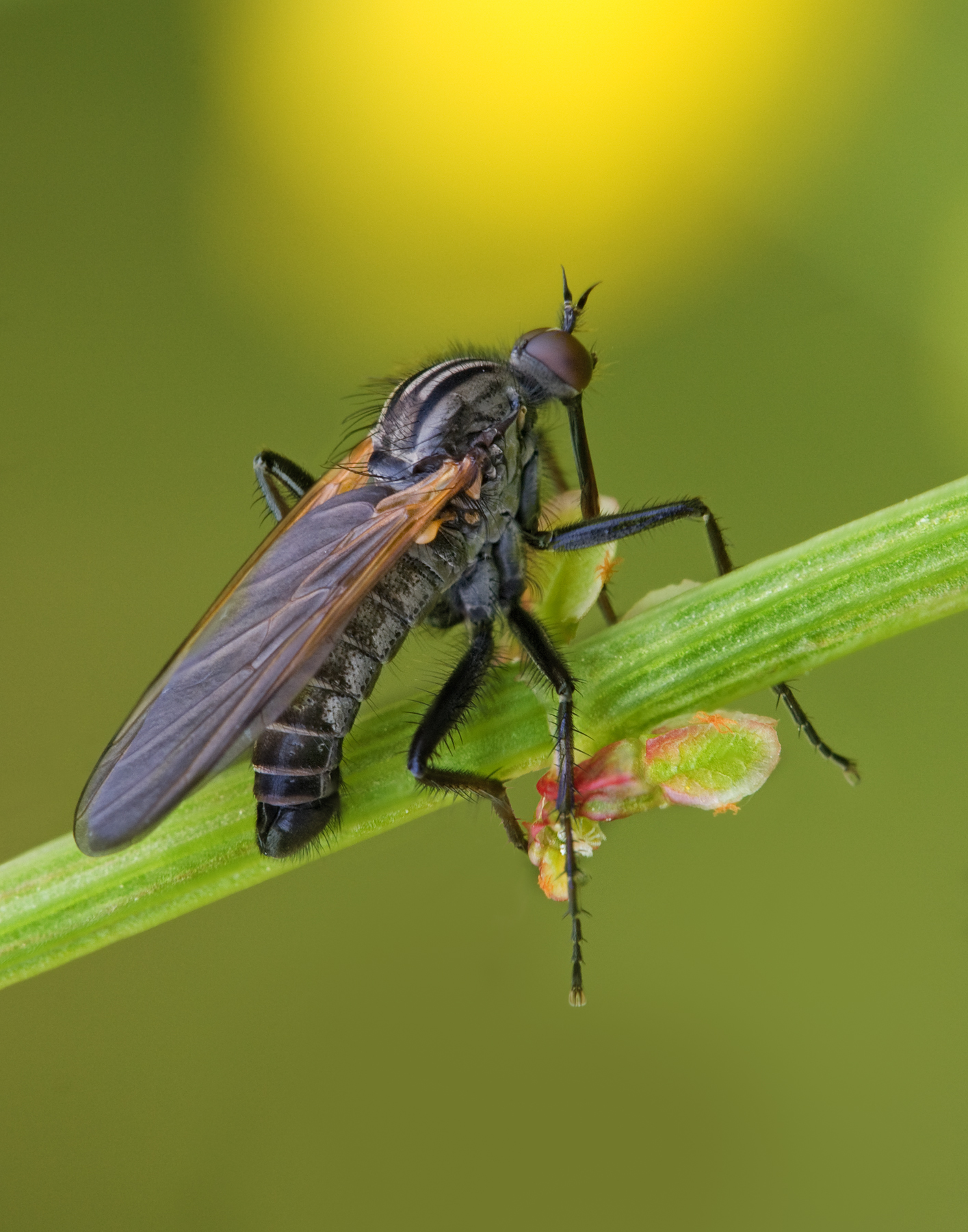
- Empis tessellata. Male

Scientific classification
- Kingdom: Animalia
- Phylum: Arthropoda
- Class: Insecta
- Order: Diptera
- Family: Empididae
- Genus: Empis
- Subgenus: Euempis
- Species: E. tessellata

Binomial name
- Empis tessellata Fabricius, 1794

Synonyms
- Empis atripe s Strobl, 1893; Empis nigripes Strobl, 1880; Empis tipuloides Strobl, 1893

= Empis tessellata =

Species of fly

Empis tessellata is a species of dance fly, in the fly family Empididae. It is included in the subgenus Euempis.

== Distribution ==
The species is distributed in most of Europe from the Mediterranean to Scandinavia, in the east to the Middle East and Central Asia to Japan.

== Habitat ==
These dance flies can be found on various plants on moist meadows, on forest edges, on clearings and lightly wooded areas.

== Description ==
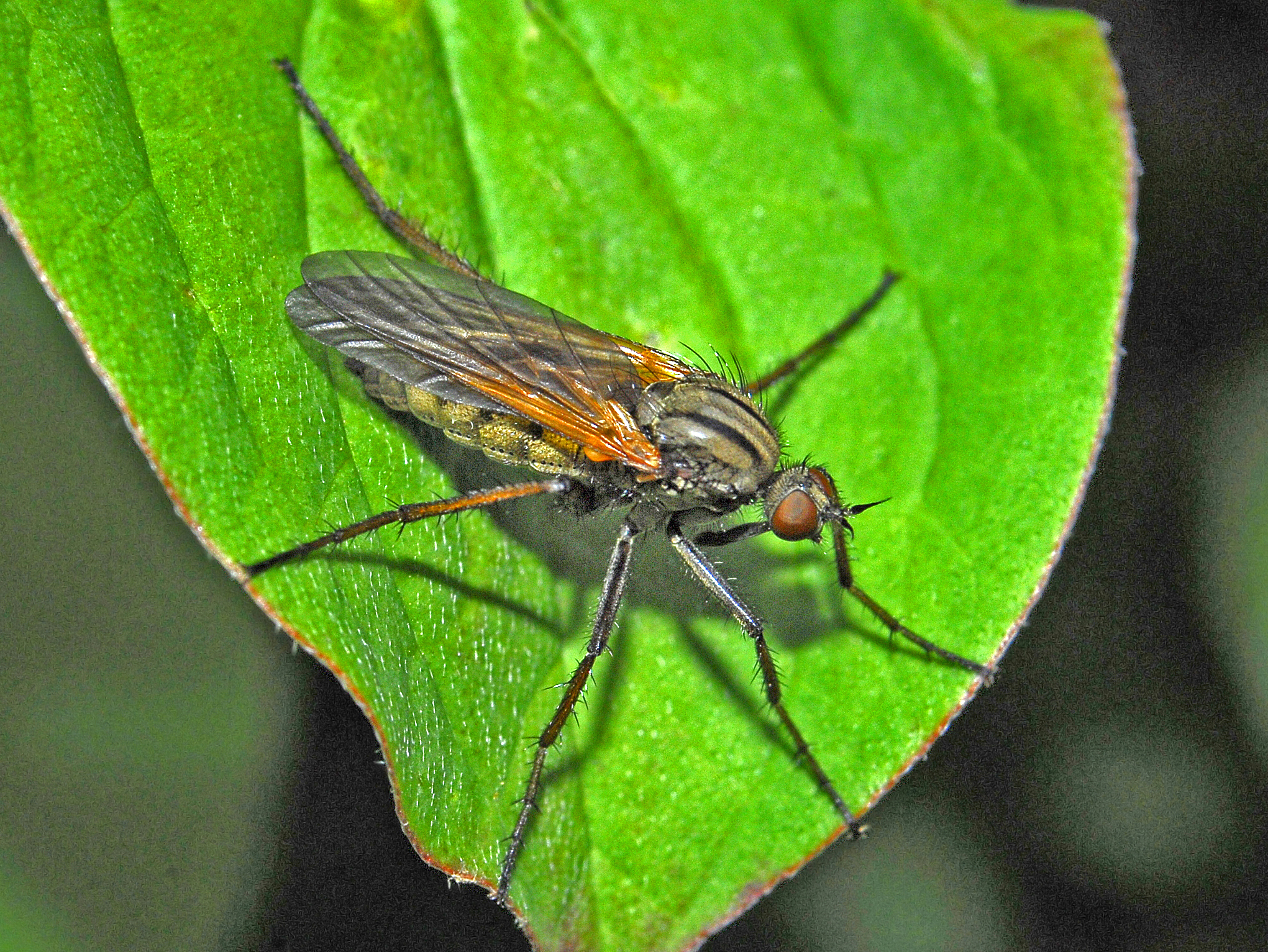
Female

Empis tessellata can reach a length of about 9–11 millimetres (0.35–0.43 in) and a wingspan of 9.3–11 millimetres (0.37–0.43 in). These large dance flies have a strongly black bristled body. The long legs are varying in color, usually they are red-yellow with black thighs. The brown-tinged wings have dark brown veins and rusty-yellow costal margin. The head is small and almost spherical with black antennae, large brown eyes and a long pointed proboscis.

The thorax is gray-black in ground color and carries three black longitudinal stripes. The abdomen is elongated and arched, marbled bronze-gray. The 3rd (last) antennal segment bears a two-segmented seta. The sexes are distinguishable by the size of their eyes. In the males, they are narrowly contiguous, widely separated in the females.

Empis tessellata is the largest British Empis species, though there are other similar sized species in mainland Europe.

== Biology ==
Adults can be seen from April to August. Apparently, only adult males are predatory on other insects, but also larvae are predatory. Adults mainly hunt Diptera or other small insects, but they also feed on the nectar of flowers. especially of umbellifers.

Before mating, the male catches prey to present as a gift to the female. Only then the mating takes place. The creamy-yellow larvae live underneath the ground and in leaf litter.

== Gallery ==
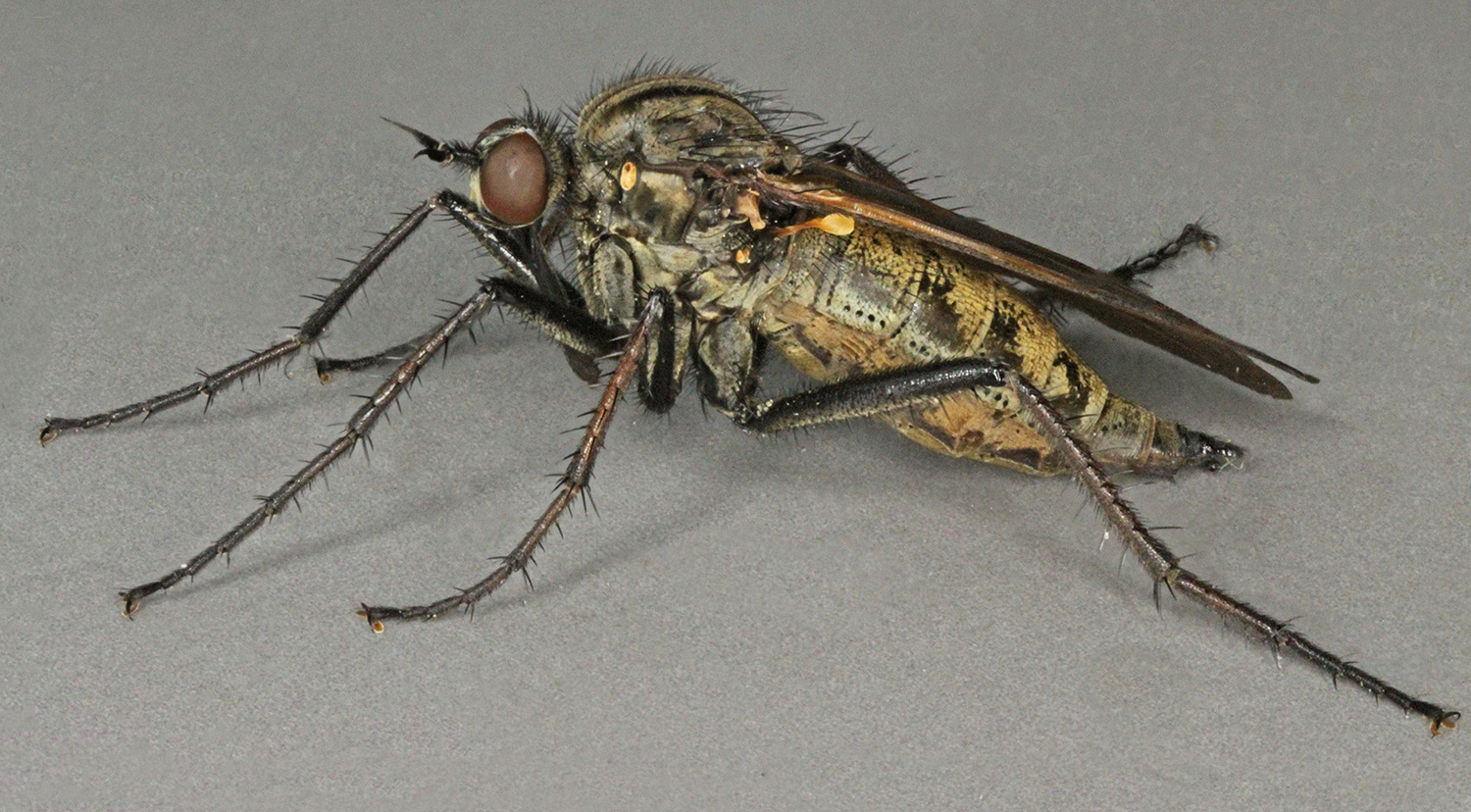
Side view

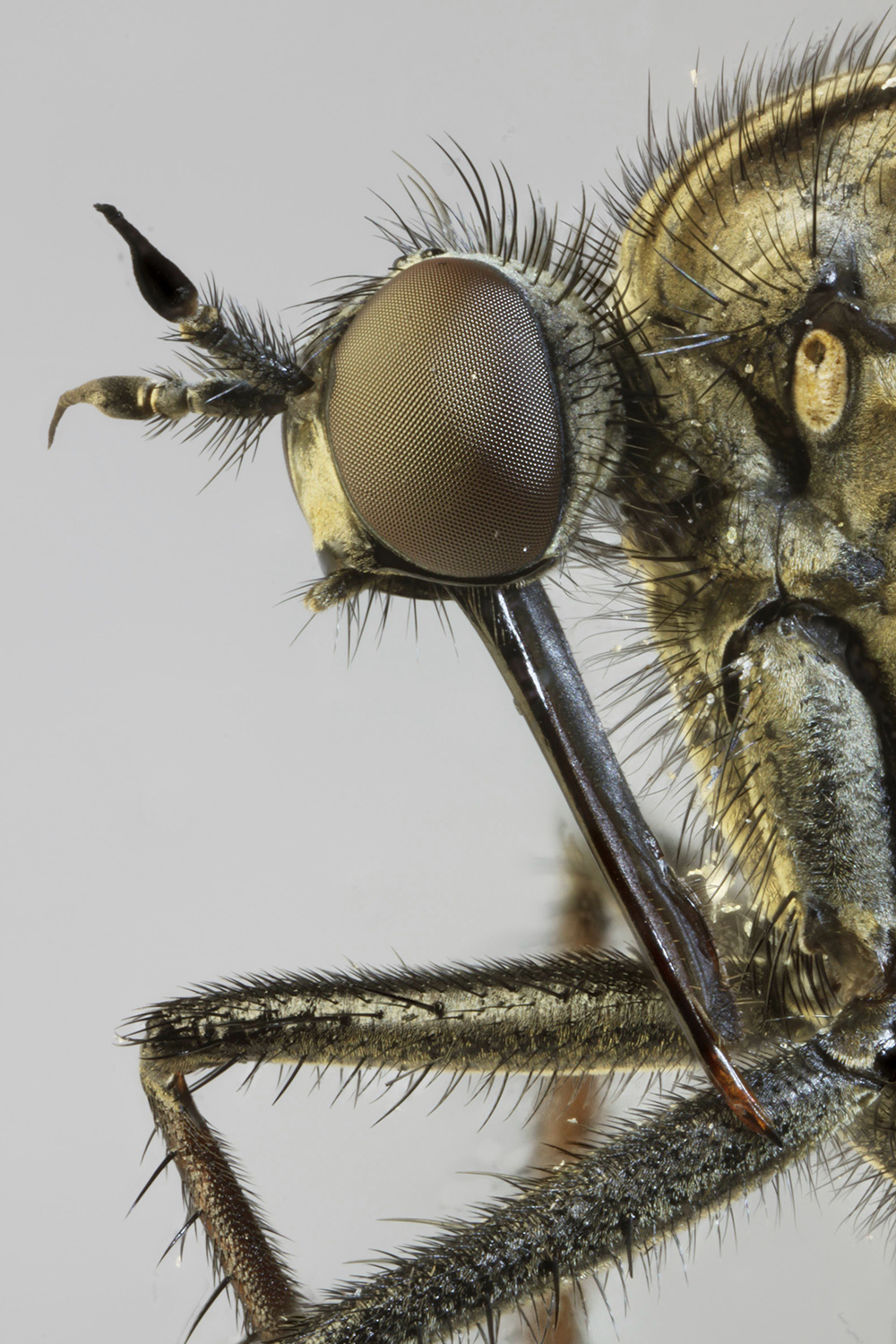
Close-up of the head

Feeding on "Scabiosa" species (video clip)

In copula (video clip)
