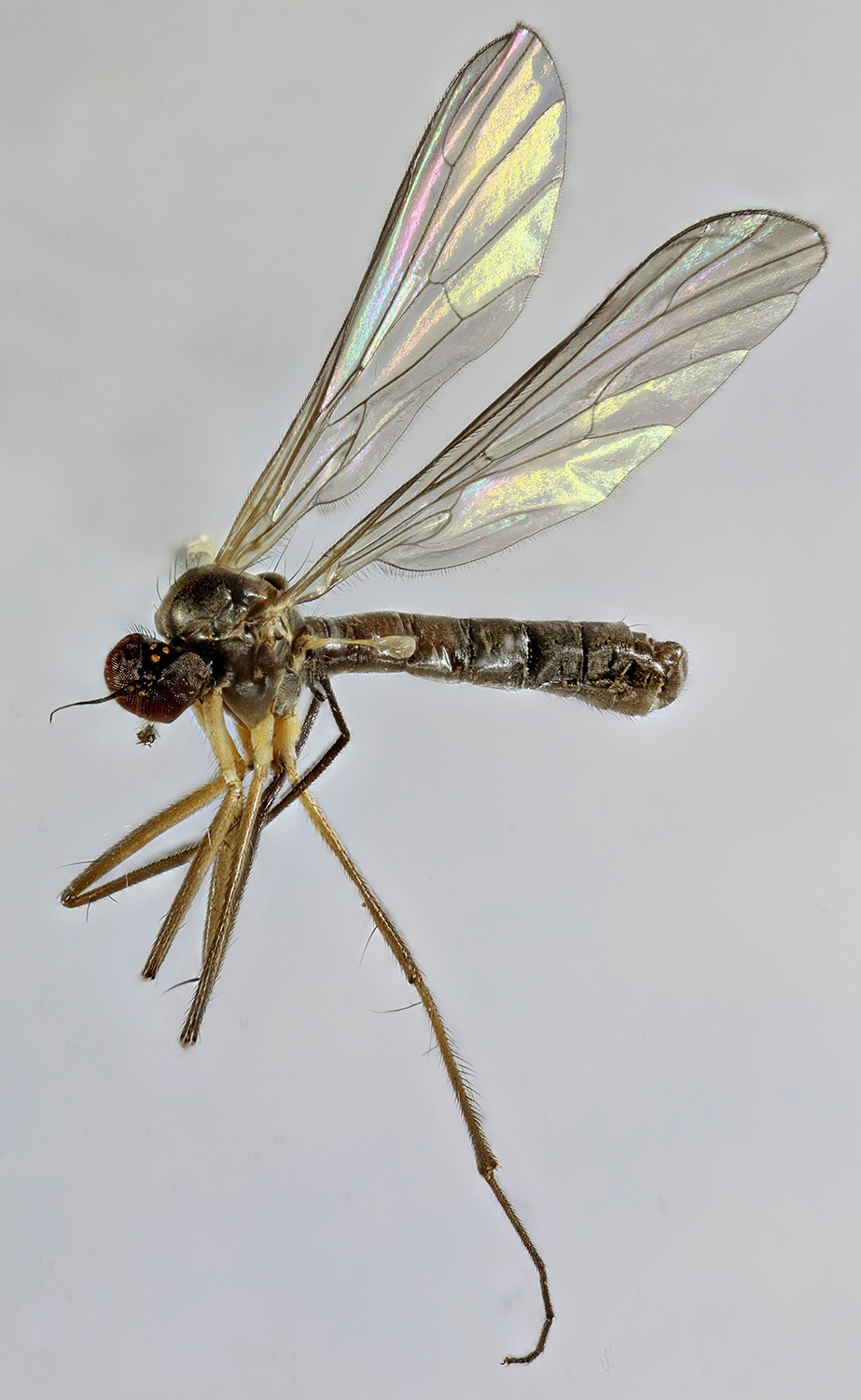
- Trichopeza longicornis North Wales

Scientific classification
- Kingdom: Animalia
- Phylum: Arthropoda
- Class: Insecta
- Order: Diptera
- Family: Empididae
- Subfamily: Trichopezinae
- Genus: Trichopeza; Rondani, 1856

Type species
- Brachystoma longicornis Meigen, 1822

= Trichopeza =

Genus of flies

Trichopeza is a genus of empidoid flies. They are mainly predatory flies like most of their relatives, and generally small to medium-sized, long-legged and large-eyed.

== Species ==
- T. albocincta (Boheman, 1846)
- T. chaomek (Plant, 2009)
- T. longicornis (Meigen, 1822)
- T. milleri Smith, 1989
- T. pia (Plant, 2009)
- T. taiwanensis Yang & Horvat, 2006
