= Ceratempis =

Scientific classification
- Domain: Eukaryota
- Kingdom: Animalia
- Phylum: Arthropoda
- Class: Insecta
- Order: Diptera
- Family: Empididae
- Subfamily: Trichopezinae
- Genus: Ceratempis; Melander, 1927

Genus of flies

Ceratempis is a genus of flies in the family Empididae. There is one described species in Ceratempis, C. longicornis.
