= Ephydrempis =

Scientific classification
- Domain: Eukaryota
- Kingdom: Animalia
- Phylum: Arthropoda
- Class: Insecta
- Order: Diptera
- Family: Empididae
- Subfamily: Trichopezinae
- Genus: Ephydrempis; Saigusa, 1986

Type species
- Ephydrempis setiventris Saigusa, 1986

Genus of flies

Ephydrempis is a genus of flies in the family Empididae.

== Species ==
- E. setiventris Saigusa, 1986
