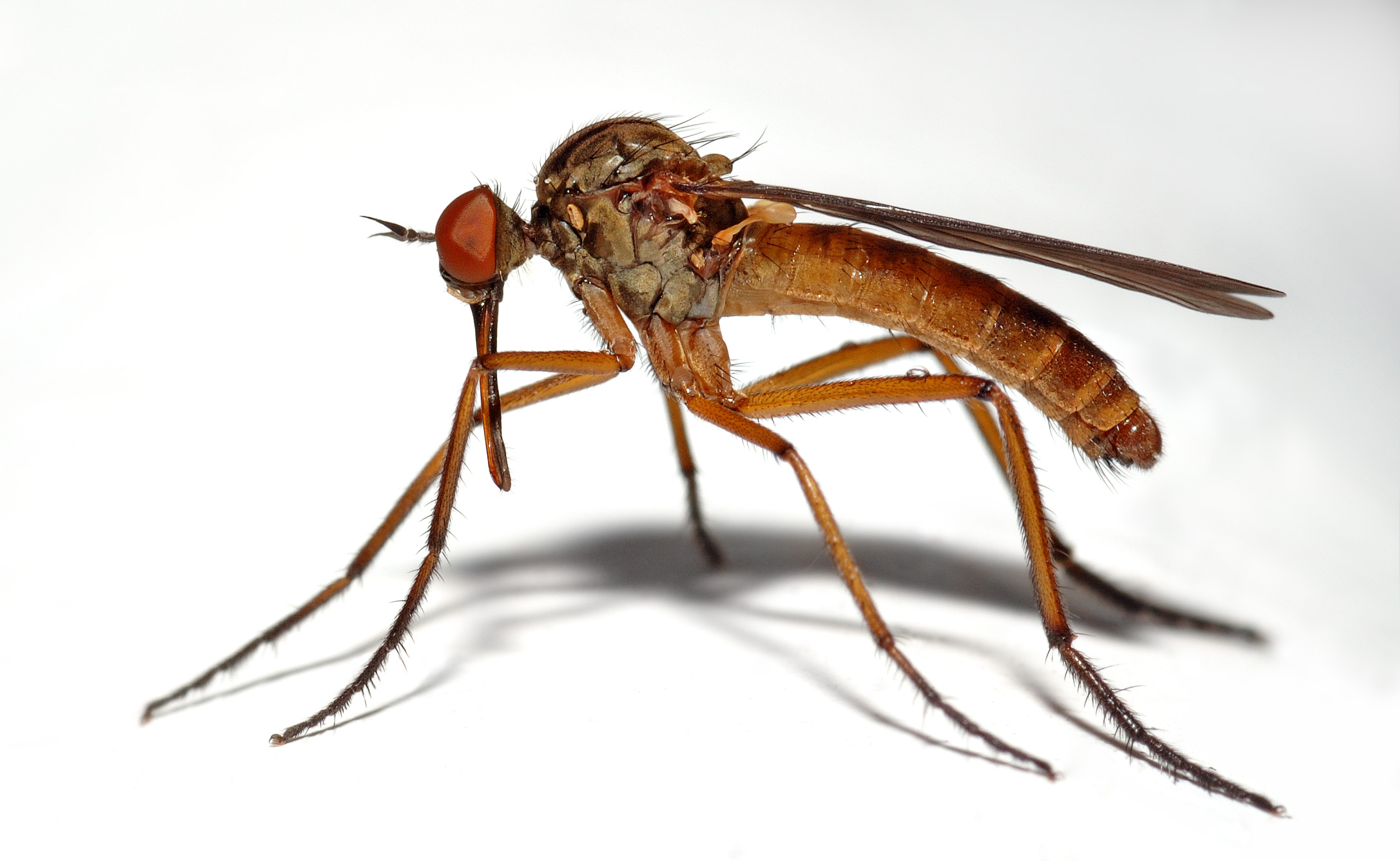
- Male Empis livida

Scientific classification
- Kingdom: Animalia
- Phylum: Arthropoda
- Clade: Pancrustacea
- Class: Insecta
- Order: Diptera
- Family: Empididae
- Subfamily: Empidinae

Genera
- Several, see text

= Empidinae =

Subfamily of flies

Empidinae, also called dance flies, are a subfamily of empidoid flies. They belong to the Eremoneura, a lineage of flies whose larvae pass through three stages. The name “dance flies” comes from their mating swarms, formed by males or, in some species, by females; in many cases males present captured prey to females during these gatherings. They are mainly predatory flies like most of their relatives, and generally small to medium-sized. Most species are flower visitors and they can be effective pollinators.

== Description ==
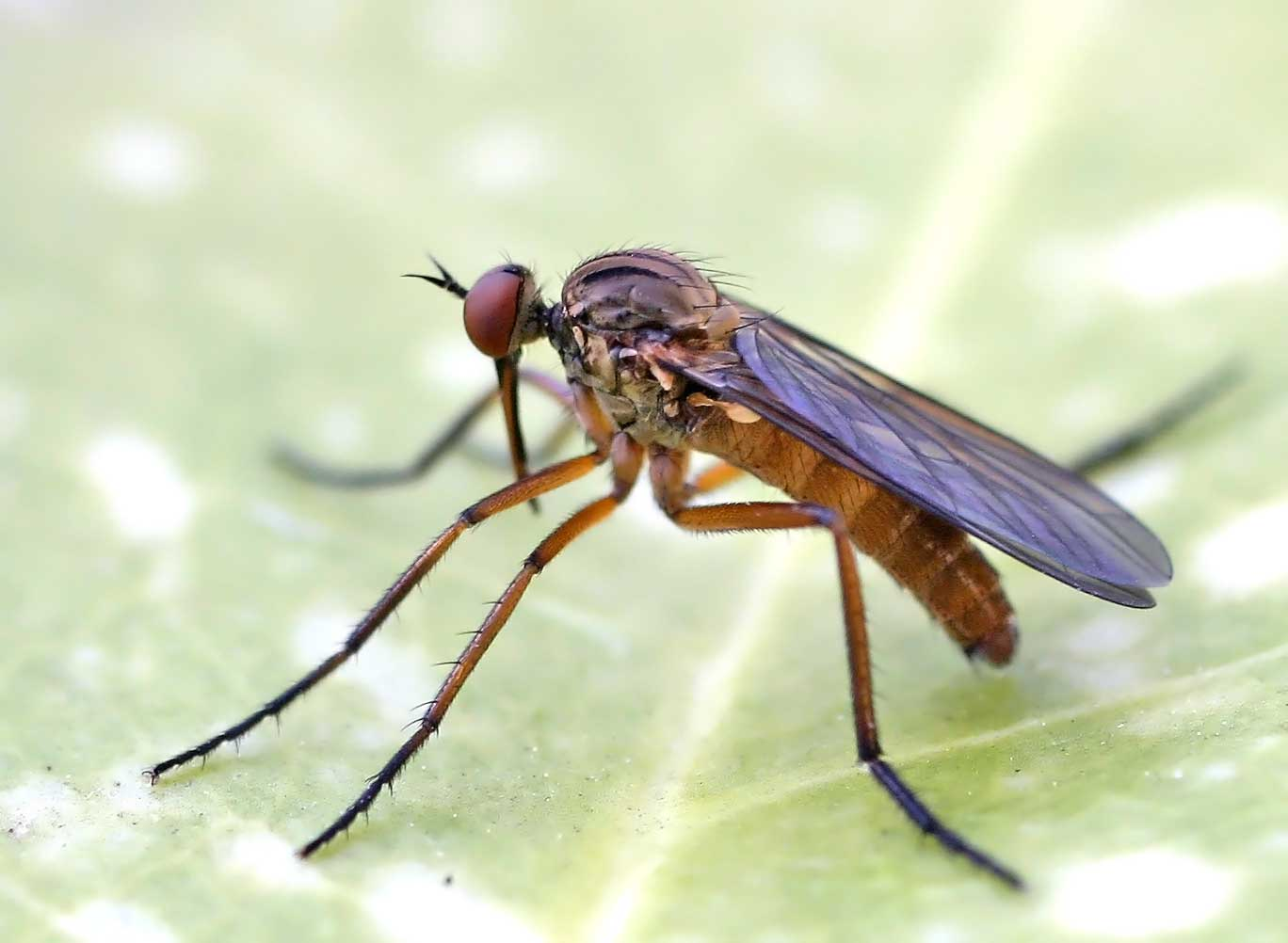
Empis stercorea

Most dance fly species perform lek mating, where males give courtship gifts to females. About a third of such species also have sex-specific markings, which include pinnate leg scales, darkened or enlarged wings, and inflatable abdominal air sacs.

== Genera ==
Most species of the Empidinae have long been placed in the large genera Empis and Rhamphomyia, separated by whether a particular wing vein (R4+5) forks near the tip. Earlier work on Patagonian species also recognised smaller Neotropical genera, including Sphicosa, Clinorhampha, Macrostomus, Porphyrochroa, Lamprempis, and Opeatocerata.

In South America the Empidinae fall into two broad sets: an Andean group in temperate Chile and Argentina, which shares features with Australian and New Zealand taxa, and a warmer-climate group in the wider Neotropics that includes Macrostomus, Porphyrochroa, Lamprempis, Opeatocerata, and some Empis. Many Neotropical species remain undescribed, especially in Porphyrochroa. Recent taxonomy has revalidated Porphyrochroa as distinct from Macrostomus and added numerous new species in both.

- Afroempis Smith, 1969
- Allochrotus Collin, 1933
- Amictoides Bezzi, 1909
- Aplomera Macquart, 1838
- Atrichopleura Bezzi, 1909
- Bandella Bickel, 2002
- Calohilara Frey, 1952
- Clinorhampha Collin, 1933
- Cunomyia Bickel, 1998
- Deuteragonista Philippi, 1865
- Empidadelpha Collin, 1928
- Empis Linnaeus, 1758
- Gynatoma Collin, 1928
- Hilara Meigen, 1822
- Hilarempis Bezzi, 1905
- Hilarigona Collin, 1933
- Hybomyia Plant, 1995
- Hystrichonotus Collin, 1933
- Lamprempis Wheeler & Melander, 1901
- Macrostomus Wiedemann, 1817
- Opeatocerata Melander, 1928
- Pasitrichotus Collin, 1933
- Porphyrochroa Melander, 1928
- Rhamphella Malloch, 1930
- Rhamphomyia Meigen, 1822
- Sphicosa Philippi, 1865
- Thinempis Bickel, 1996
- Trichohilara Collin, 1933

== Distribution ==
Empidinae are especially diverse in the Neotropical region. Fourteen genera are currently recognized worldwide, twelve of them recorded in the Neotropics and seven found only there.
