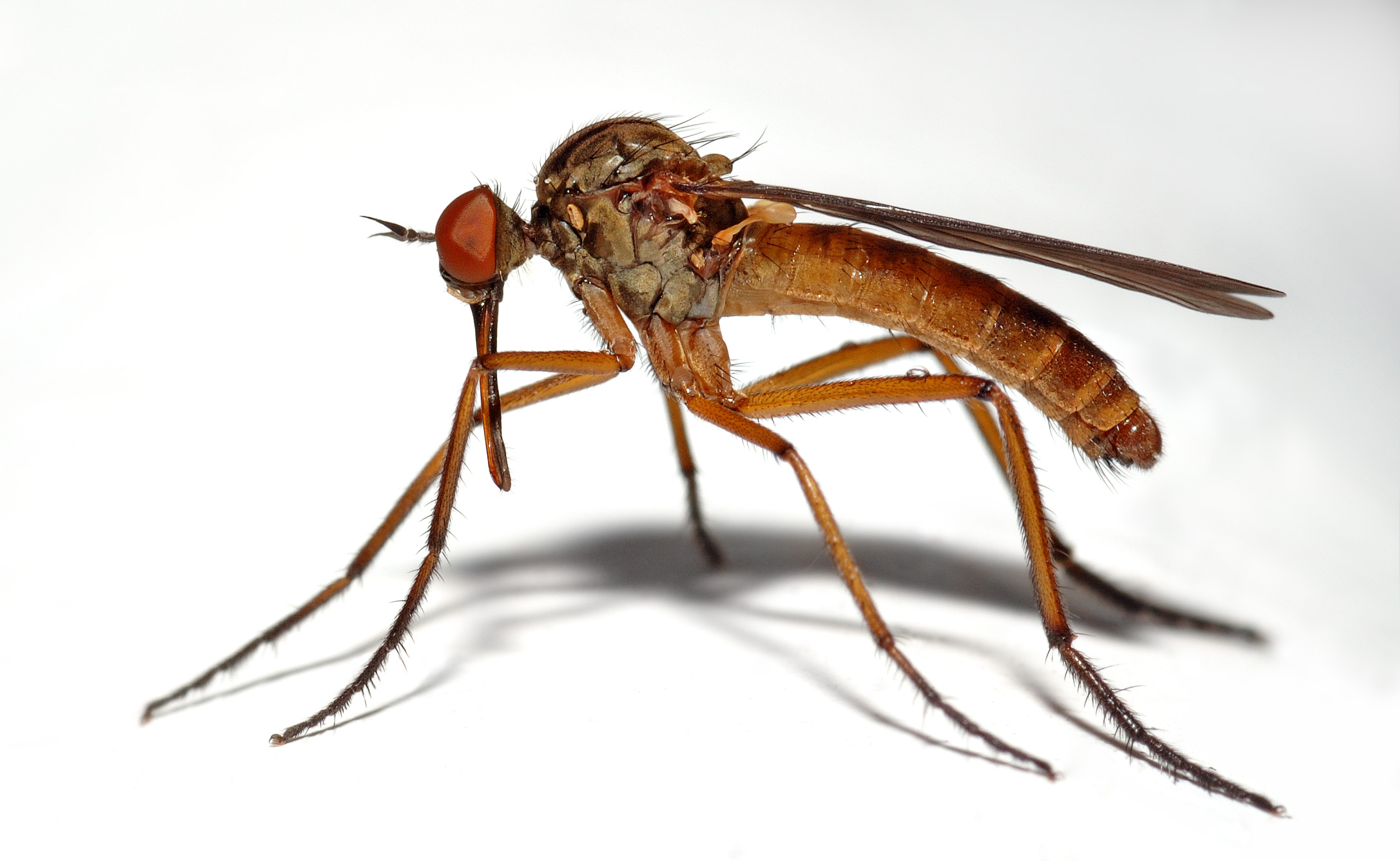
- Male Empis livida

Scientific classification
- Kingdom: Animalia
- Phylum: Arthropoda
- Clade: Pancrustacea
- Class: Insecta
- Order: Diptera
- Suborder: Brachycera
- Infraorder: Asilomorpha
- Superfamily: Empidoidea
- Family: Empididae; Latreille, 1804

Subfamilies
- Brachystomatinae; Ceratomerinae; Clinocerinae; Empidinae; Hemerodromiinae; Trichopezinae

= Empididae =

Dagger flies and balloon flies Temporal range: Cretaceous - Recent

Family of flies

Empididae is a family of flies with over 3,000 described species occurring worldwide in all the biogeographic realms but the majority are found in the Holarctic. They are mainly predatory flies like most of their relatives in the Empidoidea, and exhibit a wide range of forms but are generally small to medium-sized, non-metallic and rather bristly.

Common names for members of this family are dagger flies (referring to the sharp piercing mouthparts of some species) and balloon flies. The term "dance flies" is sometimes used for this family too, but the dance flies proper, formerly included herein, are now considered a separate family Hybotidae.

== Description ==
Empididae are small to medium-sized flies, rarely large (1.0 to 15.0 mm). The body is slender, or elongated and rarely thickset. The colour ranges from yellow to black, and they may be pollinose or lustrous, but never have a metallic gloss. The head is often small and rounded with relatively large eyes. The eyes of the male and (rarely) the female may be contiguous (holoptic). The antenna usually have three segments of which the third is the largest and bears a long or short, usually apical arista or style. The eyes often have an incision (notch) at the level of the antennae. The proboscis is often long and in several genera powerful and piercing. If the mouthparts are strongly elongate they project forward or downward toward the fore legs. Some species have short mouthparts. The legs are usually long and slender but often powerful and in some cases, the fore legs are raptorial, adapted to catching and holding prey. The wings are clear or partially tinged and, in some species, with a stigma spot, or with a distinct pattern. Radial vein R_{4+5} is often forked and the discal-medial cell (dm) is almost always present. The costa ends at or just beyond R_{4+5}, or continues along the wing margin, and can be used as a characteristic to distinguish it from other families. The venation of the wings in minute species is often simplified. The posterior part of the wings on the basal side of the anal vein bears the designation of axillary or anal lobe. In species with a highly developed axillary lobe, the margin may form an angle with the margin of the alula. This is termed the axillary angle, the size of which is often a good diagnostic feature. It can be distinguished from Dolichopodidae and Hybotidae by the presence of unrotated and symmetrical terminalia. The point of origin of R_{s} (radial sector) is at a distance from the humeral crossvein (h) equal to or longer than the length of h. Except for a few species, Empididae is easily distinguishable from the families Ragadidae and Atelestidae by having a prosternum that is fused with the proepisternum, which forms a precoxal bridge.

The larvae have a very slim and reduced head capsule (hemicephalic) which is often retracted into the thorax and an eight-segmented abdomen with paired prolegs, distally bearing hooks, on abdominal segments 1–7 or 1–8. The posterior spiracles are highly separated if present at all and the anal segment typically bears one to four lobes. The predaceous or detritus-consuming larvae feed using mouth hooks with constrained movement. The pupae do not have a puparium.

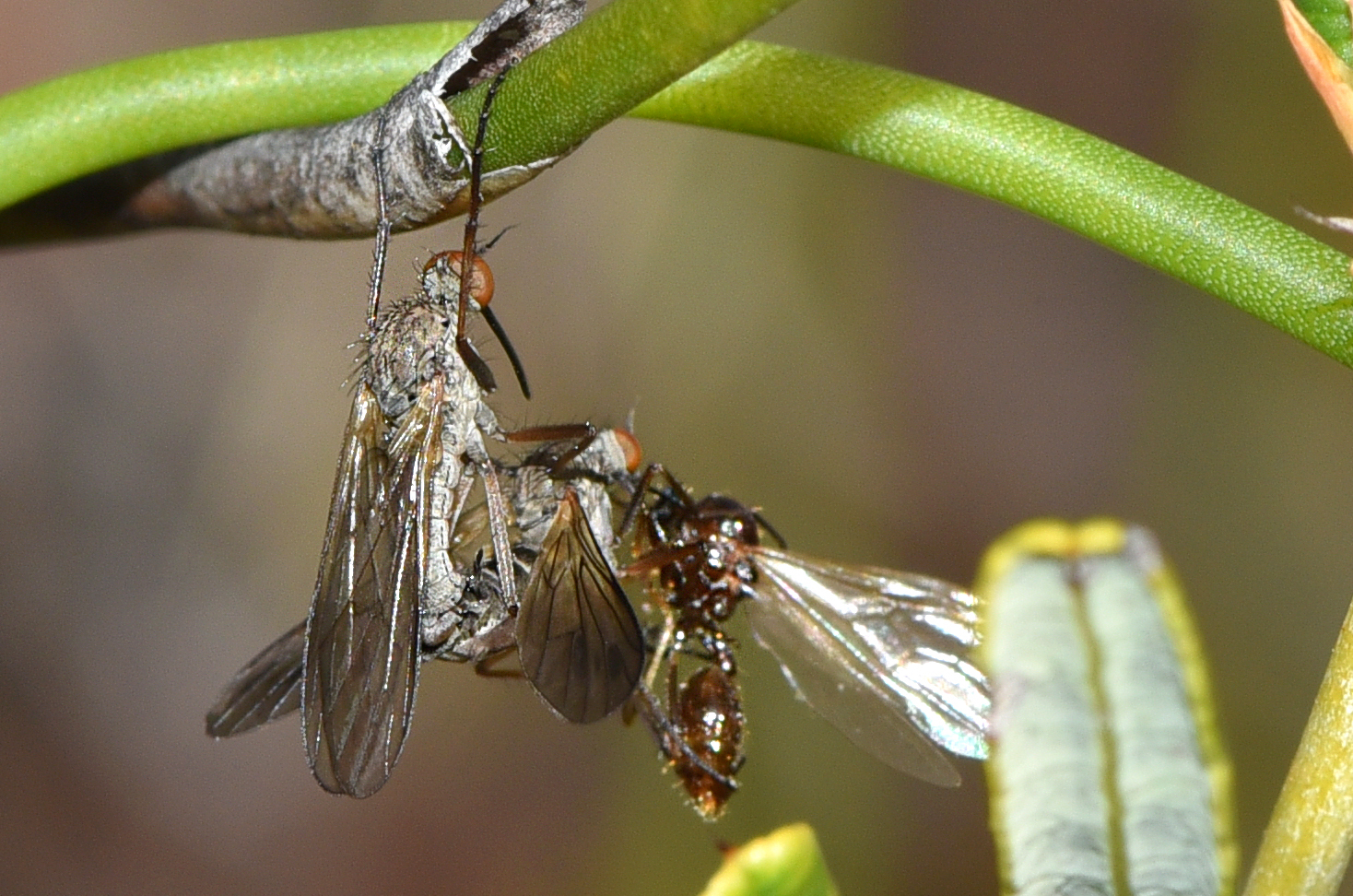
Mating Empididae: Female consuming male's mating gift of an ant

== Biology ==
Adult empidids are found in a variety of forest habitats, on the leaves of plants, on tree trunks, aquatic vegetation and also in stream beds and seepage habitats. Some species are associated with open areas such as grasslands, agricultural fields, marshes, coastal zones and beaches. Adults capture arthropod prey, including other Diptera (including other empidids), Hemiptera, Homoptera, Lepidoptera, Trichoptera, Thysanoptera, Hymenoptera, Neuroptera, Plecoptera, Ephemeroptera, Coleoptera, Collembola, and Acari. Because of their predation they are important natural and biological control agents of various pest insect species and as a group with a vast species diversity they occupy a wide range of habitats. Some adult Empididae also visit flowers to obtain nectar. At least a few groups (Iteaphila, Anthepiscopus, Anthalia, Allanthalia and Euthyneura) obtain all their protein needs by feeding on pollen. Larvae are generally found in moist soil, rotten wood, dung, or in aquatic habitats and also appear to be predaceous on various arthropods, particularly other Diptera larvae.

Some Empididae, such as the European species Hilara maura, have an elaborate courtship ritual in which the male wraps a prey item in silk "balloon" and presents it to the female to stimulate copulation. It was first noticed that these flies carried "nuptial gifts" of silk by Baron Karl von Osten-Sacken. Empididae show diverse mating systems, ranging from species in which males aggregate in mating swarms, and compete for choosing females to sex-role reversed species in which females do aggregate and compete for the attention of choosing males. In some species, such as the North American species Rhamphomyia longicauda, competition for the food provided by males is so strong that females have developed elaborate ornaments, including feathery "pennate" scales on their legs, darkened wings, and inflatable abdominal sacs that enhance their attractiveness. Across the group, nuptial balloons of species in the family range from small balloons containing large prey items (e.g., Empis aerobatica, E. bullifera, Hilara wheeleri), to balloons stuck to inedible dried prey items (e.g., E. geneatis), to completely empty balloons made of silk or saliva (e.g., H. sartor, H. granditarsis).

== Evolution and systematics ==
Empididae are well represented in amber deposits and the family certainly seems to have been well established by the Cretaceous period at the latest.

Two groups formerly placed here as subfamilies are now generally regarded as separate families in the Empidoidea: Atelestidae and Hybotidae. The Brachystomatidae are also sometimes separated as a distinct family, but this seems to be in error. The Microphorinae were long placed in the Empididae as a subfamily, then briefly classified as a distinct family, and are now considered a subfamily of the long-legged flies (Dolichopodidae).

Dolichocephala irrorata (Clinocerinae) in copula

Among the subfamilies currently placed herein, not all are confirmed to be monophyletic groups. Some rearrangements, in particular regarding the delimitation of Empididae versus Dolichopodidae – which together represent the bulk and the most advanced lineages of the Empidoidea – are likely to take place in the future. The Brachystomatinae, Empidinae and Hemerodromiinae however seem to be natural groups of closest relatives in their entirety, and the Clinocerinae apparently are for the largest part.

Based on the most recent phylogenetic studies, the relationship between Empididae and other members of Empidoidea is as follows. The placement of Empididae is emphasized in bold formatting.

- Atelestidae
  - - Atelestinae
    - Nemedininae
- - Hybotidae
    - Bicellariinae
    - - - - - - Hybotinae
              - Oedaleinae
            - Ocydromiinae
          - Trichininae
        - Tachydromiinae
          - - Tachydromiini
            - Symballaphthalmini
          - Drapetini
  - - Dolichopodidae
    - - Ragadidae
        - Iteaphilinae
        - Ragadinae
      - **Empididae**
        - Clinocerinae
        - - Brachystomatinae
            - Brachystomatini
            - Ceratomerini
            - Trichopezini
          - Empidinae
            - - Chelipodini
              - Empidini
            - - Hemerodromiini
              - Hilarini

== Genera ==
The subfamilies with their tribes and selected genera are:

Empidinae Schiner, 1862

- Tribe Empidini
  - Clinorhampha Collin, 1933
  - Edenophorus Smith, 1969
  - Empidadelpha Collin, 1928
  - Empis Linnaeus, 1758
  - Hystrichonotus Collin, 1933
  - Lamprempis Wheeler & Melander, 1901
  - Macrostomus Wiedemann, 1817
  - Opeatocerata Melander, 1928
  - Porphyrochroa Melander, 1928
  - Rhamphella Malloch, 1930
  - Rhamphempis Daugeron, 2024
  - Rhamphomyia Meigen, 1822
  - Sphicosa Philippi, 1865
- Tribe Hilarini
  - Afroempis Smith, 1969
  - Allochrotus Collin, 1933
  - Amictoides Bezzi, 1909
  - Aplomera Macquart, 1838
  - Atrichopleura Bezzi, 1909
  - Bandella Bickel, 2002
  - Cunomyia Bickel, 1998
  - Deuteragonista Philippi, 1865
  - Gynatoma Collin, 1928
  - Hilara Meigen, 1822
  - Hilarempis Bezzi, 1905
  - Hilarigona Collin, 1933
  - Hybomyia Plant, 1995
  - Pasitrichotus Collin, 1933
  - Thinempis Bickel, 1996
  - Trichohilara Collin, 1933
- Tribe Chelipodini
  - Afrodromia Smith, 1969
  - Chelipoda Macquart, 1823
  - Chelipodozus Collin, 1933
  - Drymodromia Becker, 1914
  - Monodromia Collin, 1928
  - Phyllodromia Zetterstedt, 1837
  - Ptilophyllodromia Bezzi, 1904
- Tribe Hemerodromiini
  - Chelifera Macquart. 1823
  - Cladodromia Bezzi, 1933
  - Colabris Melander, 1928
  - Doliodromia Collin, 1928
  - Hemerodromia Meigen, 1822
  - Metachela Coquillett, 1903
  - Neoplasta Coquillett, 1895

Clinocerinae Collin, 1928

- Aclinocera Yang & Yang, 1995
- Afroclinocera Sinclair, 1999
- Asymphyloptera Collin, 1933
- Bergenstammia Mik, 1881
- Clinocera Meigen, 1803
- Clinocerella Engel, 1918
- Dolichocephala Macquart, 1823
- Hypenella Collin, 1941
- Kowarzia Mik, 1881
- Oreothalia Melander, 1902
- Phaeobalia Mik, 1881
- Proagomyia Collin, 1933
- Proclinopyga Melander, 1928
- Rhyacodromia Saigusa, 1986
- Roederiodes Coquillett, 1901
- Trichoclinocera Collin, 1941
- Wiedemannia Zetterstedt, 1838

Brachystomatinae Melander, 1908 (Brachystomatidae was found to be nested within Empididae in Wahlberg & Johanson, 2018, and lowered to subfamily status, though some authors continue to treat the group as its own family within Empidoidea)

- Tribe Brachystomatini
  - Anomalempis Melander, 1928
  - Brachystoma Meigen, 1822
  - Xanthodromia Saigusa, 1986
- Tribe Ceratomerini
  - Ceratomerus Philippi, 1865
  - Glyphidopeza Sinclair, 1997
  - Zealandicesa Koçak & Kemal, 2010
- Tribe Trichopezini
  - Afropeza Sinclair & Shamshev, 2014
  - Rubistella Garrett Jones, 1940
  - Group Heleodromia
    - Heleodromia Haliday, 1833
    - Pseudoheleodromia Wagner, 2001
  - Group Heterophlebus
    - Apalocnemis Philippi, 1865
    - Gloma Meigen, 1822
    - Heterophlebus Philippi, 1865
  - Group Niphogenia
    - Ceratempis Melander, 1927
    - Niphogenia Melander, 1928
  - Group Trichopeza
    - Boreodromia Coquillett, 1903
    - Ephydrempis Saigusa, 1986
    - Sabroskyella Wilder, 1982
    - Trichopeza Rondani, 1856

Incertae sedis

- Brochella Melander, 1927
- Philetus Melander, 1928
- Group Hesperempis
  - Dryodromia Rondani, 1856
  - Hesperempis Melander, 1906
  - Toreus Melander, 1906

== Identification ==
- Chvála, M. (1994) The Empidoidea (Diptera) of Fennoscandia and Denmark. III. Genus Empis. Leiden: Brill 29.
- Collin, J.E. (1961) British Flies. VI. Empididae. Cambridge: Cambridge University Press.
- Engel, E. O., 1938-1954 Empididae. In: Lindner, E. (Ed.). Die Fliegen der Paläarktischen Region, 4, 28, 1-400.
- Frey, R. 1954- 1956 Empididae. In: Lindner, E. (Ed.). Die Fliegen der Paläarktischen Region 4, 28, 400-639.
- Gorodkov, K. B. and Kovalev V.G. Family Empididae in Bei-Bienko, G. Ya, 1988 Keys to the insects of the European Part of the USSR Volume 5 (Diptera) Part 2 English edition. Keys to Palaearctic species but now needs revision .

== Gallery ==
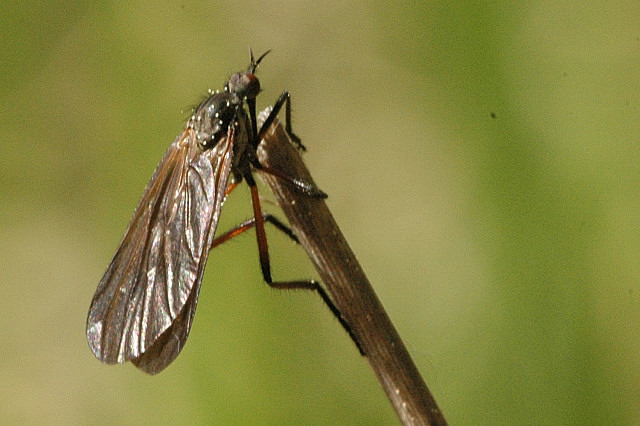
Empis borealis

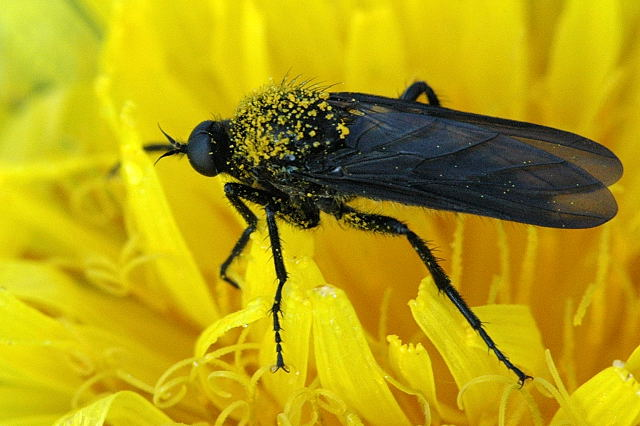
Empis ciliata

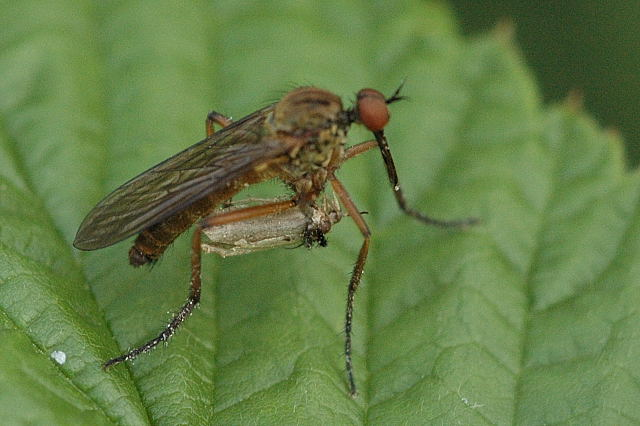
Empis livida with prey

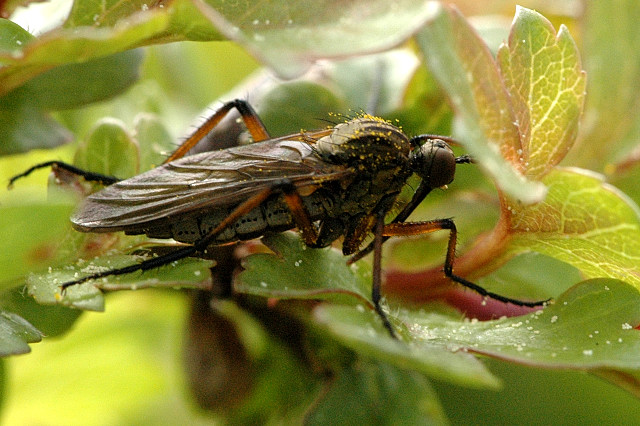
Empis opaca

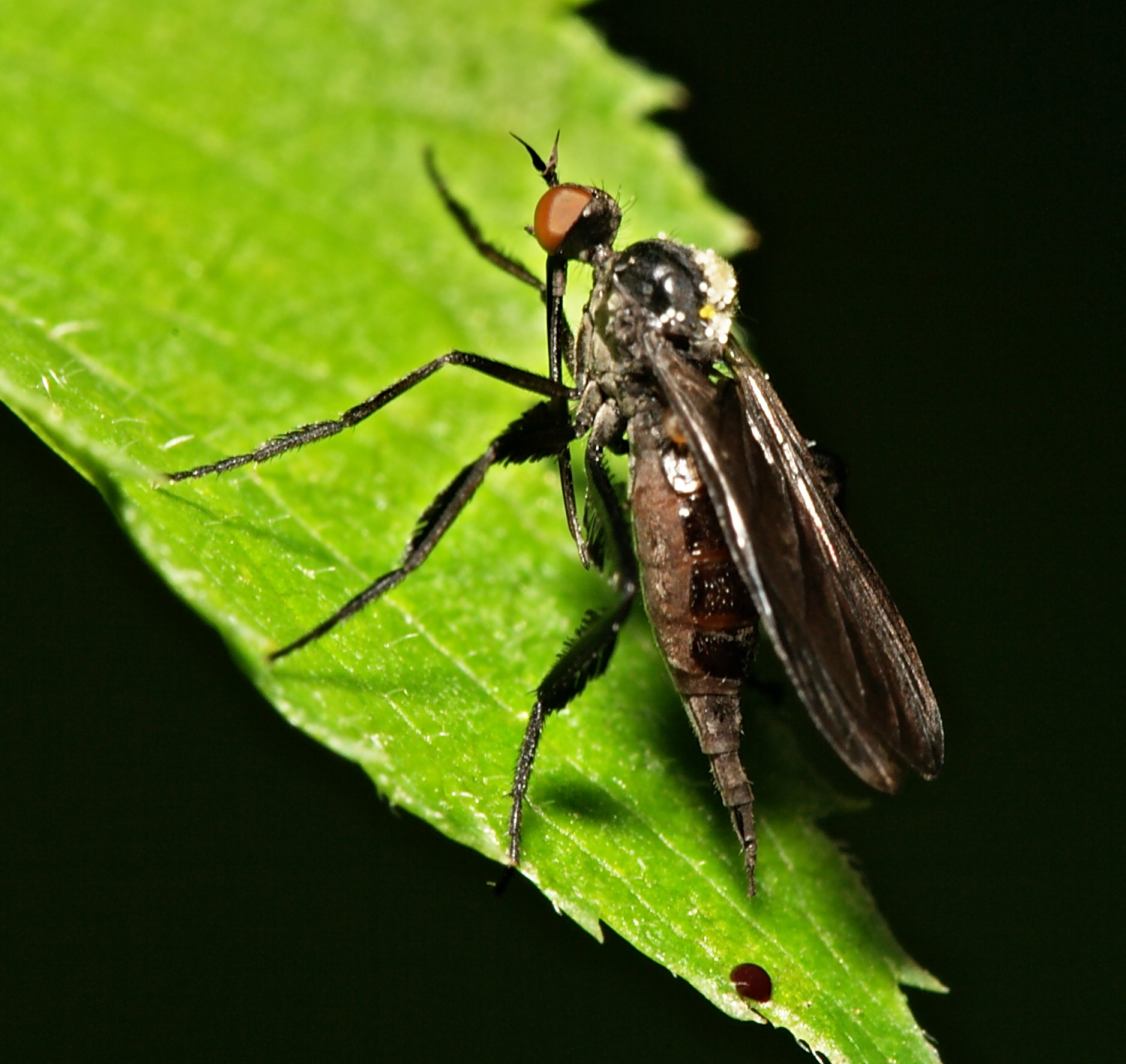
Empis pennipes

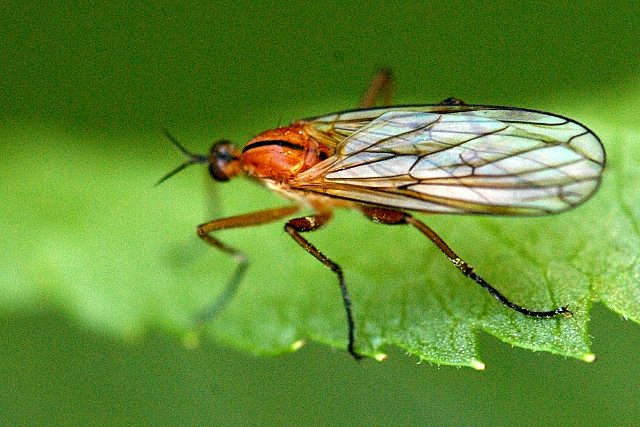
Empis stercorea

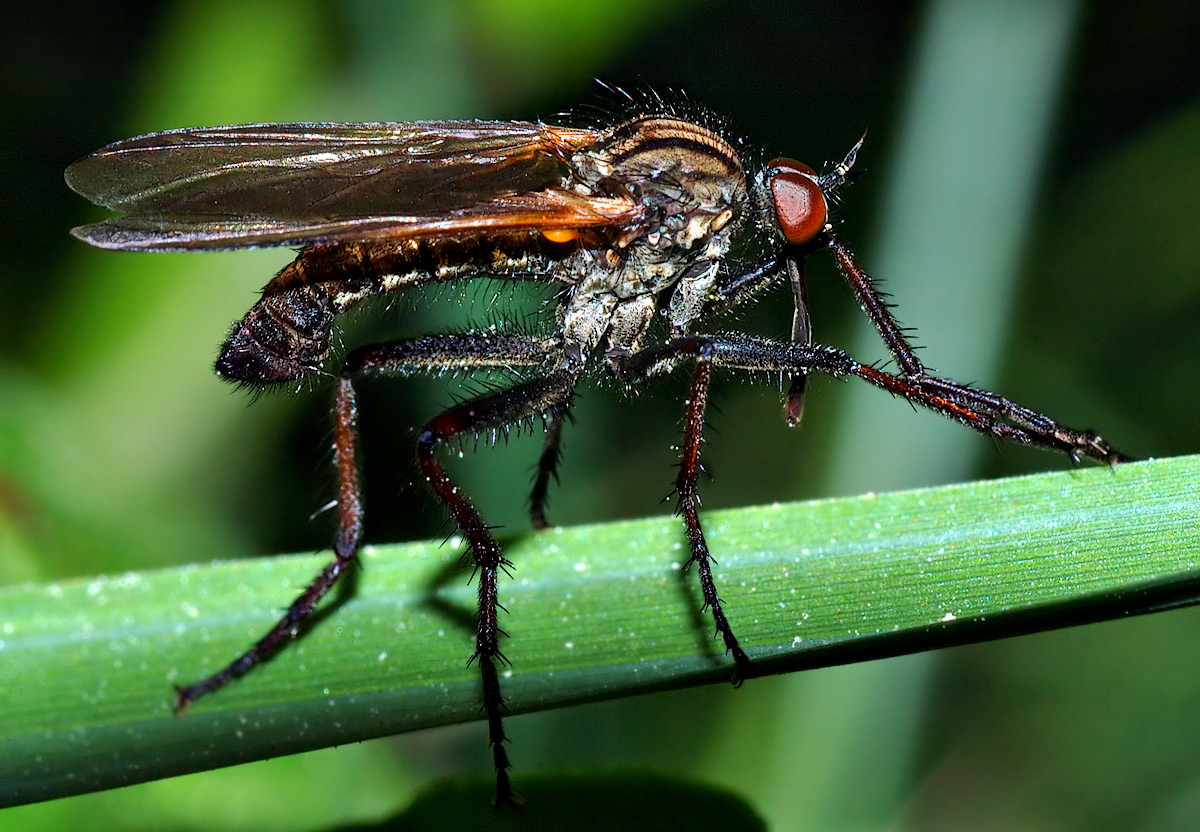
Empis tessellata

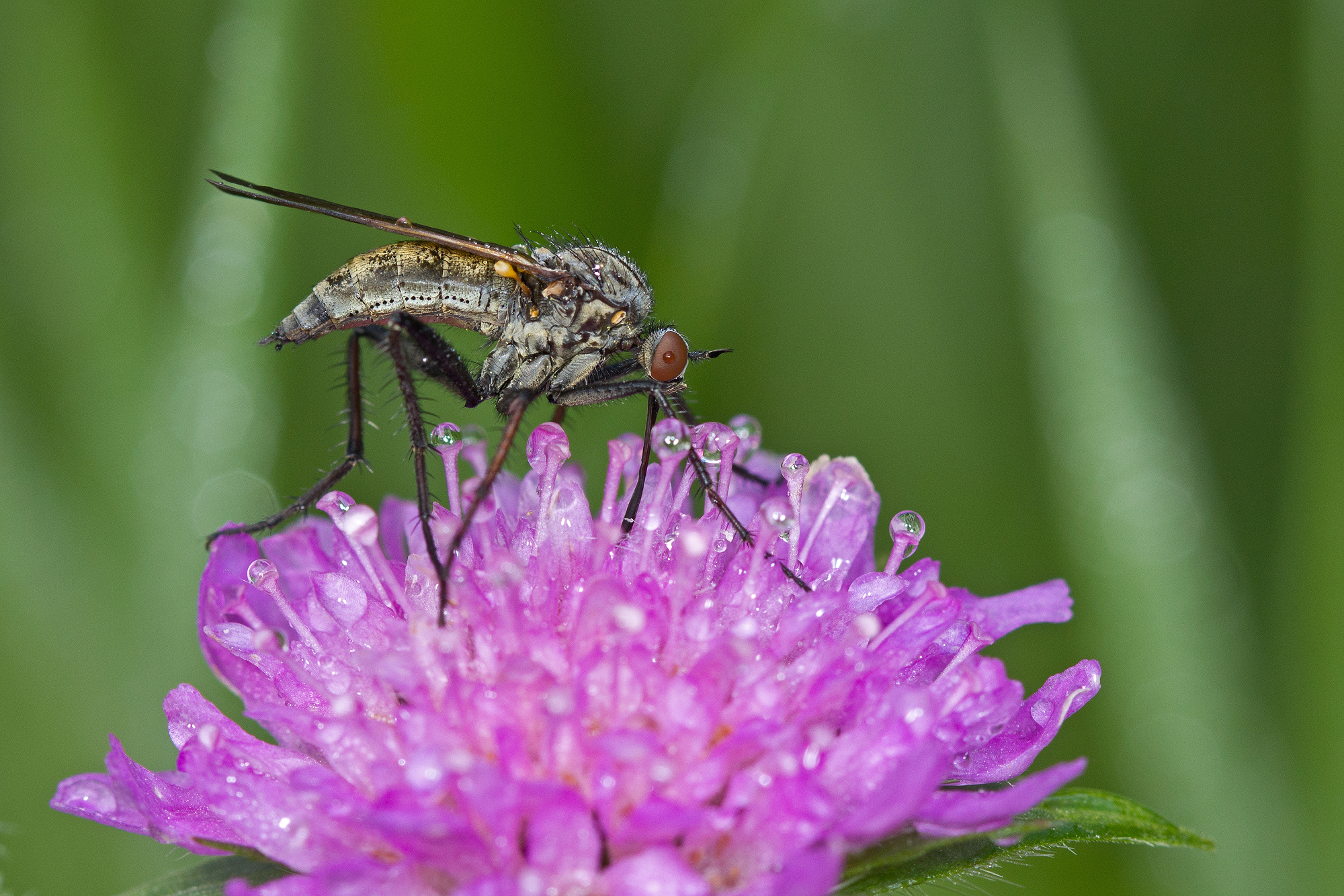
Empis tessellata

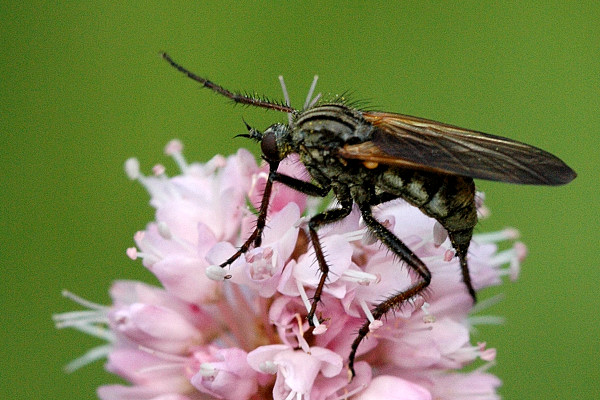
Empis variegata

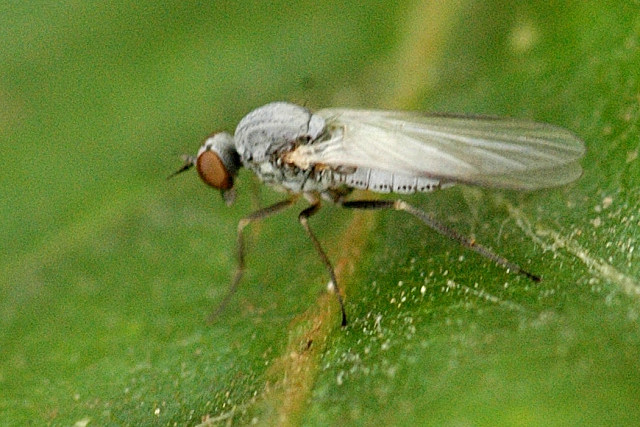
Hilara litorea

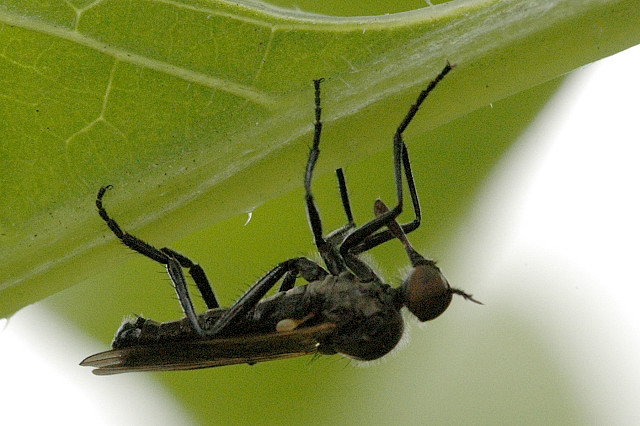
Rhamphomyia crassirostris

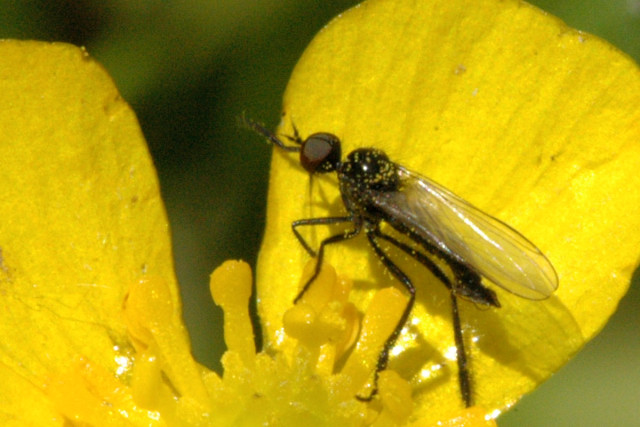
Rhamphomyia lamellata

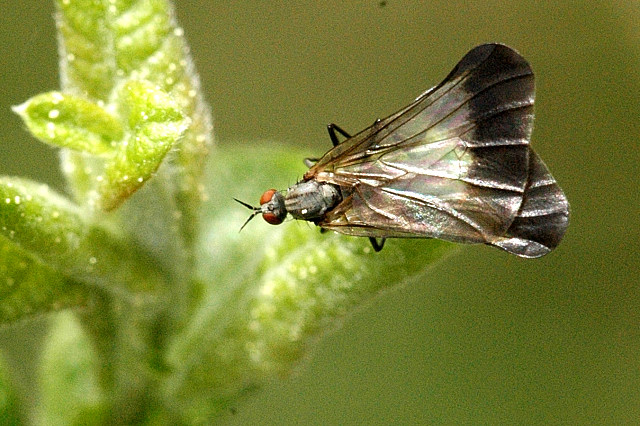
Rhamphomyia marginata

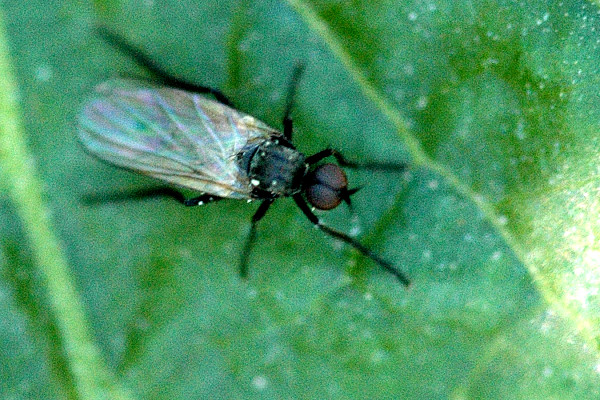
Rhamphomyia sulcata

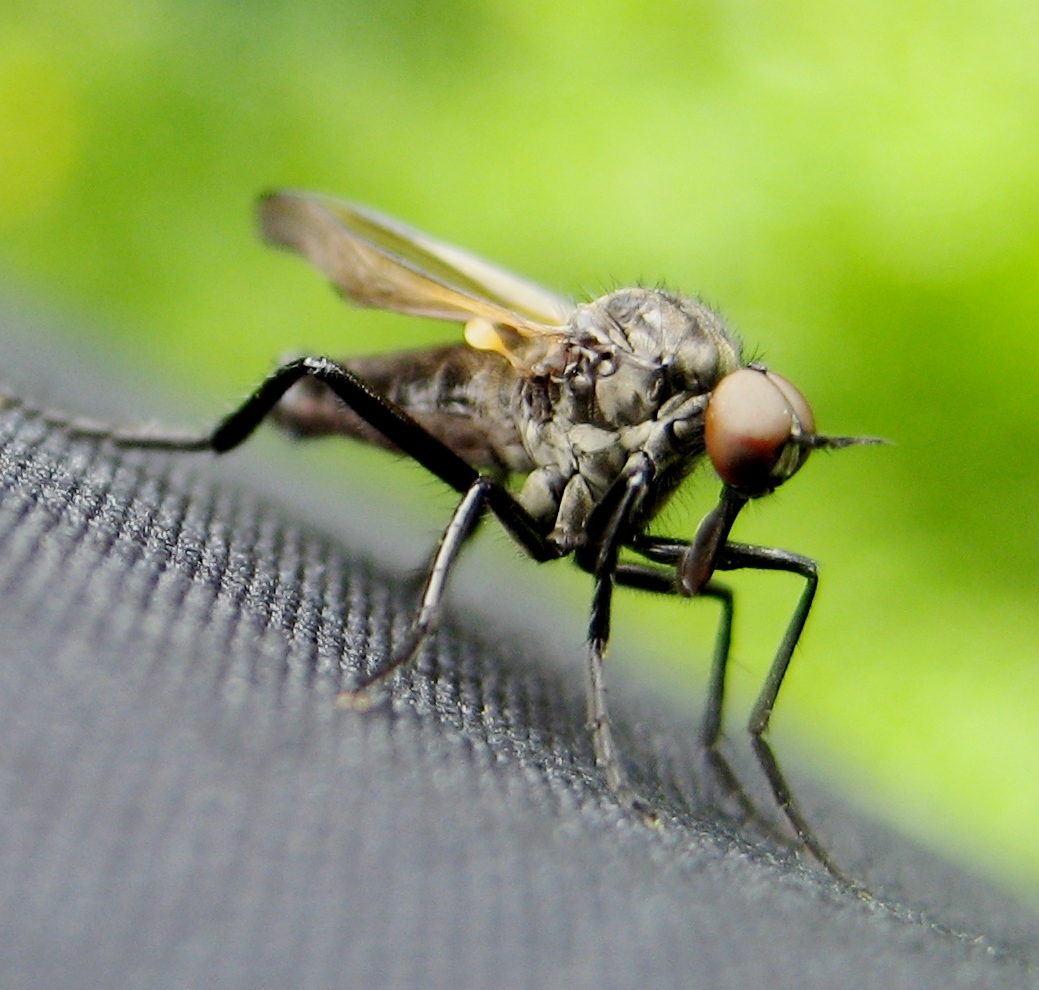
Empididae sp.

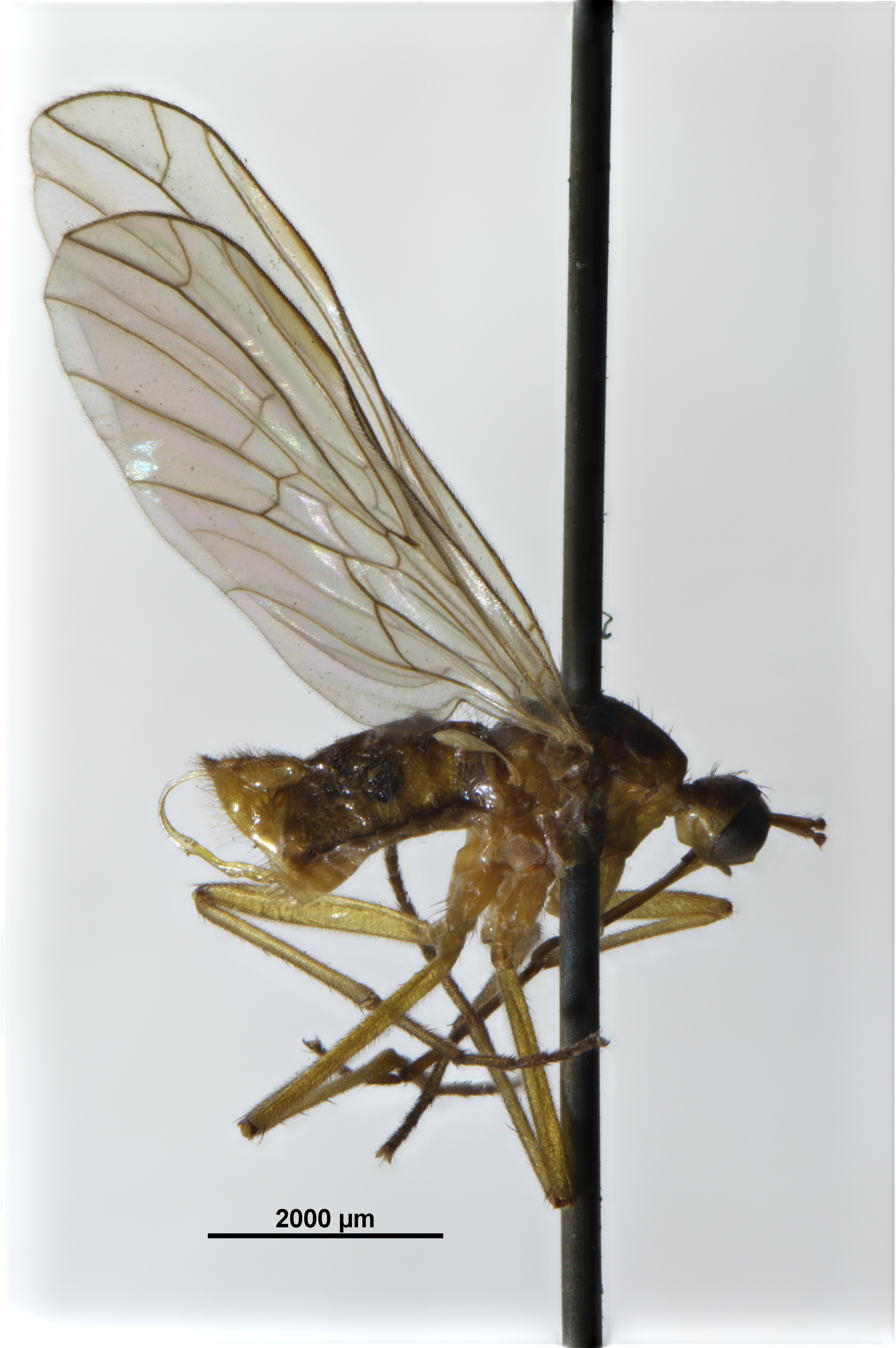
Empis trigramma

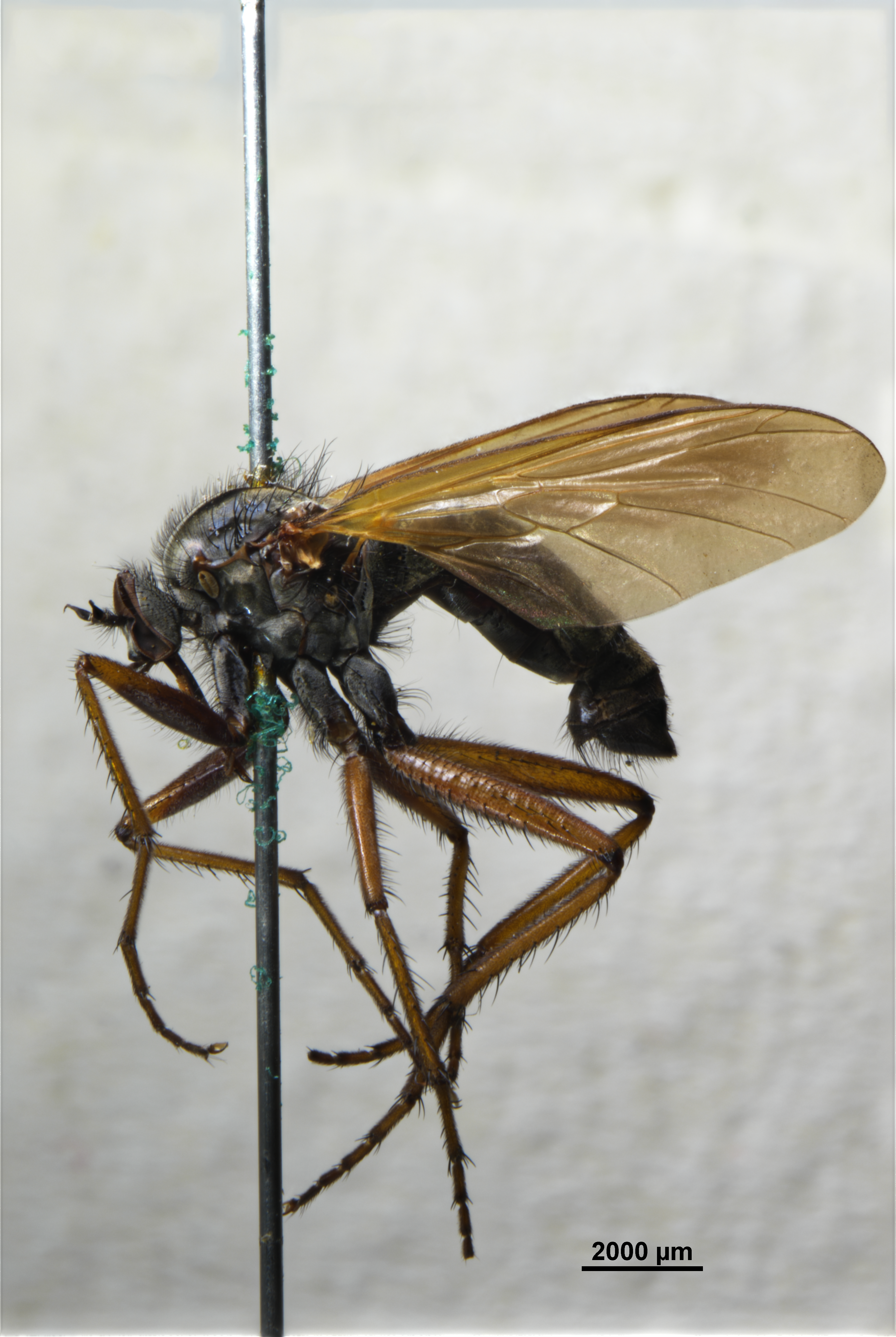
Empis tessellata
