= List of Sites of Special Scientific Interest in Herefordshire =

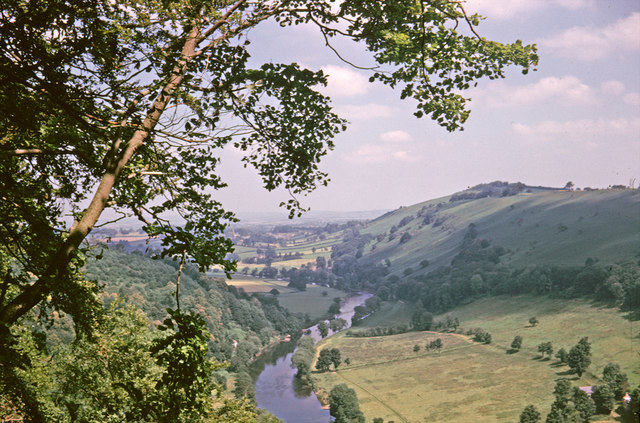
Upper Wye Gorge and River Wye SSSIs at Symonds Yat Rock, Herefordshire.

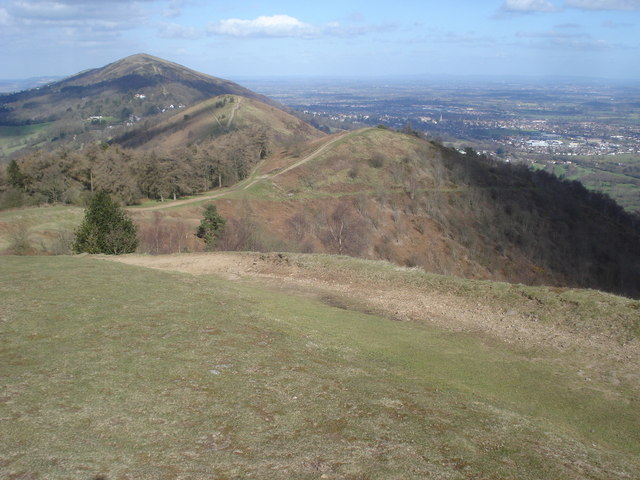
The Malvern Hills, an SSSI on the boundary of Worcestershire and Herefordshire

This is a list of the Sites of Special Scientific Interest (SSSIs) in Herefordshire, England. In England the body responsible for designating SSSIs is Natural England, which chooses a site because of its fauna, flora, geological or physiographical features. As of 2012, there are 83 sites designated in this Area of Search. There are 21 sites with a geological interest, and 62 listed for biological interest. Four sites are designated for both reasons.

Natural England took over the role of designating and managing SSSIs from English Nature in October 2006 when it was formed from the amalgamation of English Nature, parts of the Countryside Agency and the Rural Development Service.

For other counties, see List of SSSIs by Area of Search.

== Sites ==
Site name	Reason for designation		Area^{[A]}		Coordinates & Grid ref^{[B]}	Year in which notified	Other designations	Map^{[C]} & Citation
Site name	Biological interest	Geological interest	Hectares	Acres	Coordinates & Grid ref^{[B]}	Year in which notified	Other designations	Map^{[C]} & Citation
Aston Ingham Meadows	✓		5.2	12.9	51.915°N 2.455°W; SO688241	1984		Map
Bank And Cother Hill	✓		18.8	46.4	52.118°N 2.359°W; SO755467	1952	AONB, WT	Map
Berrington Pool	✓		7.3	18	52.263°N 2.722°W; SO508630	1969	NT	Map
Birch Wood	✓		24.3	60.1	51.988°N 2.566°W; SO612323	1985		Map
Birchend	✓		3.2	7.8	52.098°N 2.485°W; SO669445	1975		Map
Bishon Meadow	✓		6.5	16	52.088°N 2.838°W; SO427436	1992		Map
Black Mountains	✓		1189.2	2938.7	51.997°N 3.047°W; SO282337	1954	NCR	Map
Bradnor Hill Quarry		✓	0.5	1.2	52.213°N 3.041°W; SO290577	1952	GCR, NT	Map
Brampton Bryan Park	✓		165	407.7	52.341°N 2.936°W; SO363718	1969	NCR	Map
Burrington Farm Stream Section		✓	0.4	1.1	52.349°N 2.826°W; SO438727	1969	GCR	Map
Burrington Meadow	✓		2.7	6.6	52.34°N 2.816°W; SO445716	1971		Map
Burrington Sections		✓	1.2	3	52.348°N 2.819°W; SO443725	1986	GCR	Map
Bushy Hazels & Cwmma Moors	✓		30.3	74.8	52.153°N 3.046°W; SO285510	1969	NT, NCR	Map
Byton & Combe Moors	✓		18.2	45	52.265°N 2.935°W; SO363634	1969		Map
Caeiron Meadow	✓		1.6	3.9	52.041°N 3.047°W; SO283386	1989		Map
Cage Brook Valley	✓		5	12.4	52.042°N 2.802°W; SO451385	1969		Map
Capler Wood	✓		5.9	14.6	51.989°N 2.601°W; SO588325	1969	AONB	Map
Chanstone Wood	✓		40.6	100.4	52.011°N 2.94°W; SO356352	1969		Map
Cherry Hill Wood	✓		39.4	97.3	52.014°N 2.621°W; SO575353	1952	AONB, WT	Map
Church Hill Quarry		✓	0.7	1.7	52.358°N 2.866°W; SO411737	1989	GCR	Map
Common Hill	✓		12.9	31.9	52.011°N 2.608°W; SO584349	1975	AONB	Map
Coughton Wood And Marsh	✓		1.4	3.4	51.886°N 2.597°W; SO590210	1986	AONB, WT	Map
Crumpton Hill Wood	✓		1.6	3.9	52.137°N 2.352°W; SO760488	1975	AONB	Map
Devil's Spittleful	✓		99.3	245.3	52.374°N 2.285°W; SO807751	1955	WT	Map
Dinmore Hill Woods	✓		152.5	376.8	52.16°N 2.716°W; SO511516	1952	CP, LNR	Map
Downton Gorge	✓	✓	68.9	170.3	52.363°N 2.821°W; SO442742	1952	GCR, NNR, NCR, SAC	Map
Eastnor Park	✓		153.3	378.8	52.037°N 2.37°W; SO747377	1990	AONB	Map
Elton Lane Cutting		✓	0.3	0.6	52.329°N 2.786°W; SO465704	1969	GCR	Map
Fishpool Valley	✓		33.1	81.8	52.29°N 2.808°W; SO450661	1952	NT	Map
Flintsham & Titley Pools	✓		18.7	46.2	52.23°N 2.99°W; SO325595	1969	WT	Map
Great Doward	✓		1.5	3.8	51.844°N 2.659°W; SO547164	1969	WT, AONB	Map
Grimley Brick Pits	✓		18.8	46.5	52.251°N 2.236°W; SO840615	1955		Map
Halesend Wood	✓		54.9	135.6	52.14°N 2.381°W; SO740492	1969	AONB, NCR	Map
Hall Wood	✓		18.1	44.6	51.996°N 2.479°W; SO672332	1989		Map
Haugh Wood	✓		354.1	875	52.033°N 2.598°W; SO591373	1989	AONB, WT, NT	Map
Highclere	✓		1	2.6	52.13°N 1.984°W; SP012480	1994		Map
Hill Hole Dingle	✓		38.4	94.8	52.184°N 2.677°W; SO538542	1969	NCR	Map
Lea & Pagets Woods	✓		28.8	71.2	52.006°N 2.587°W; SO598343	1985	AONB, WT	Map
Ledbury Cutting		✓	1.7	4.2	52.045°N 2.423°W; SO711386	1990	GCR	Map
Linton Quarry		✓	1.4	3.5	51.929°N 2.471°W; SO677257	1969	GCR	Map
Little Byefields Meadow	✓		1.4	3.5	52.139°N 2.374°W; SO745490	1975	AONB	Map
Little Hill		✓	5.8	14.2	52.041°N 2.573°W; SO608382	1986	GCR	Map
Littlemarsh Common	✓		2.3	5.6	52.035°N 2.821°W; SO438377	1969	WT	Map
Lugg and Hampton Meadows	✓		155.7	384.7	52.06°N 2.662°W; SO547404	2011	WT	Map
Lyppard Grange Ponds	✓		1.1	2.7	52.198°N 2.178°W; SO879556	2000	SAC	Map
Mains Wood	✓		8.6	21.2	52.045°N 2.52°W; SO644386	1969		Map
Mayhill Wood	✓		7	17.3	52.031°N 2.407°W; SO722370	1975	AONB	Map
Moccas Park	✓		138.6	342.6	52.077°N 2.966°W; SO339425	1963	NNR, NCR	Map
Mocktree Quarries		✓	2.3	5.7	52.373°N 2.862°W; SO414753	1975	GCR	Map
Monnington Scar		✓	1.6	4.1	52.094°N 2.946°W; SO353444	1990	GCR	Map
Mortimer Forest		✓	6.6	16.3	52.359°N 2.762°W; SO482737	1969	GCR	Map
Moseley Common, Pembridge	✓		5.6	13.8	52.218°N 2.912°W; SO378581	1985		Map
New Inn Meadow	✓		2.6	6.5	52.141°N 2.355°W; SO758493	1981	AONB	Map
Olchon Farm Meadows	✓		2.7	6.6	51.972°N 3.018°W; SO302309	1975	NCR	Map
Orchid Bank, Winslow Mill	✓		0.5	1.3	52.023°N 2.549°W; SO624362	1975		Map
Park Wood	✓		15.2	37.5	51.856°N 2.604°W; SO585177	1975		Map
Perton Roadside Section And Quarry		✓	6.4	15.8	52.055°N 2.594°W; SO594398	1952	GCR	Map
Pikes Farm Meadows	✓		10.2	25.2	52.036°N 3.038°W; SO289380	1989		Map
Quebb Meadow	✓		1.4	3.6	52.163°N 3.023°W; SO301521	1989	WT	Map
Queestmoor Meadow	✓		1.5	3.6	52.162°N 3.017°W; SO305520	1992		Map
Ridgeway Wood	✓		31.9	78.8	52.049°N 2.376°W; SO743390	1952	AONB	Map
River Lugg	✓		142.4	352	52.258°N 2.822°W; SO440625	1995	WT, SAC	Map
River Lugg Meanders		✓	11.2	27.6	52.245°N 2.785°W; SO465611	1992	GCR	Map
River Teme	✓		441	1089.6	52.366°N 2.725°W; SO507745	1996	AONB, SAC	Map
River Wye	✓		906.1	2239	51.975°N 2.617°W; SO577309	1978	AONB, WT, NT, NCR, SAC	Map
Rockhall Quarry		✓	1.7	4.1	52.284°N 2.849°W; SO422654	1969	GCR	Map
Scutterdine Quarry		✓	1	2.3	52.028°N 2.618°W; SO577368	1952	AONB, GCR	Map
Sharpnage Wood	✓		19	46.9	52.029°N 2.582°W; SO602369	1975	AONB	Map
The Bury Farm	✓		76.6	189.2	52.165°N 2.737°W; SO497521	2006		Map
The Flits	✓		35.1	86.8	52.064°N 2.91°W; SO377410	1985	NNR, NCR	Map
The Malvern Hills	✓	✓	746.2	1844	52.045°N 2.35°W; SO761386	1954	SAM, AONB, GCR, MHC	Map
The Sturts	✓		33.9	83.6	52.122°N 2.973°W; SO335475	1997		Map
Upper Hall Farm Quarry And Grassland	✓	✓	8.9	21.9	52.042°N 2.414°W; SO717383	1969	GCR	Map
Upper Welson Marsh	✓		1.7	4.3	52.156°N 3.036°W; SO292514	1969	WT	Map
Upper Wye Gorge	✓	✓	198.3	490.1	51.835°N 2.66°W; SO546154	1969	SAM, AONB, GCR, NNR, NCR, SAC, WT	Map
Wayne Herbert Quarry		✓	0.2	0.4	51.982°N 2.97°W; SO335320	1952	GCR	Map
Wellington Wood	✓		144.5	357.2	52.141°N 2.752°W; SO486495	1986		Map
Wilton Bluff, Ross-on-wye		✓	0.3	0.7	51.912°N 2.59°W; SO595239	1988	GCR	Map
Woodshuts Wood	✓		8.7	21.6	52.034°N 2.615°W; SO579375	1984	AONB	Map
Wormbridge Common	✓		0.4	1	51.977°N 2.839°W; SO425313	1969		Map

== Notes ==
^{A} Data rounded to one decimal place.
^{B} Grid reference is based on the British national grid reference system, also known as OSGB36, and is the system used by the Ordnance Survey.
^{C} Link to maps using the Nature on the Map service provided by Natural England.
