= Upper Wye Gorge =

Protected area in England and Wales

- Site of Special Scientific Interest
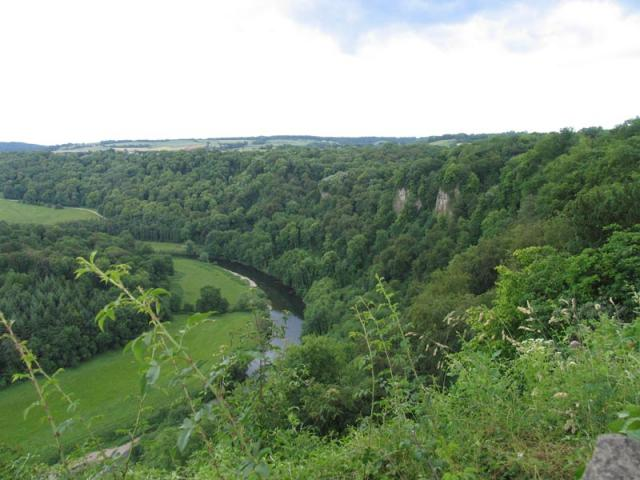
- The Wye Gorge from Symonds Yat Rock

- Location within Monmouthshire
- Location of Upper Wye Gorge.
- Area of search: Gloucestershire, Herefordshire, Monmouthshire
- Grid reference: SO560155
- Coordinates: 51.8261°N 2.6501°W
- Interest: Biological/Geological
- Area: 245.1 hectares (2.45 km^{2}; 0.946 sq mi)
- Notification date: 1969

Upper Wye Gorge is a Site of Special Scientific Interest (SSSI), noted for its biological and geological characteristics, around Symonds Yat in the Wye Valley on the Wales–England border. The site is listed in the "Forest of Dean Local Plan Review" as a Key Wildlife Site (KWS).

== Geography ==
The 245.1-hectare (606-acre) SSSI, of which 192 hectares (470 acres) are in England and 53.1 hectares (131 acres) are in Wales, notified in 1969, is located 3.5 miles (5.6 km) north east of the town of Monmouth. It lies within the civil parishes of Goodrich and Whitchurch in Herefordshire, English Bicknor in Gloucestershire and within the community of Monmouth in Monmouthshire.

The majority of the site is owned and managed by the Forestry Commission, with part of it owned and managed as a nature reserve by the Herefordshire Nature Trust. It contains part of Lady Park Wood, a national nature reserve in Wales (NNR), as well as King Arthur's Cave. Part of Lady Park Wood NNR is in England (Gloucestershire) and a larger part is in Wales.

The SSSI falls within the Wye Valley Woodlands/ Coetiroedd Dyffryn Gwy Special Area of Conservation (SAC) under the EU Habitats Directive.

== Geology ==
The gorge is formed out of Old Red Sandstone and Carboniferous Limestone, on top of which are a large variety of soils. These soils are mostly alkaline, but there are areas which have acidic surface layers.

A series of caves (including King Arthur's Cave) on the northern, English, side of the gorge is of great importance for their Pleistocene mammal remains. The oldest deposits include those from lion, red deer, reindeer, spotted hyena, woolly mammoth and woolly rhinoceros. Later deposits from colder periods include lemming and steppe pika. This provides evidence that humans had occupied the caves during this period.

== Wildlife and ecology ==
=== Flora ===
As with other woodlands in the Wye Valley Area of Outstanding Natural Beauty, the Upper Wye Gorge contains many species of trees that are locally and even nationally rare, forming one of the most extensive areas of semi-natural, broadleaved woodland in the entire valley. Due to the range of soils across the site, ten different types of woodland have been discovered to exist. Of particular interest are trees of the nationally rare large-leaved lime (Tilia platyphyllos), as well as whitebeam species: English whitebeam (Sorbus anglica), grey-leaved whitebeam (Sorbus porrigentiformis), rock whitebeam (Sorbus rupicola) and round-leaved whitebeam (Sorbus eminens).

The dominant tree species within the gorge are ash (Fraxinus excelsior), common beech (Fagus sylvatica), Cornish oak (Quercus petraea), English oak (Quercus robur) and silver birch (Betula pendula). Mid-level flora includes hazel (Corylus avellana), field maple (Acer campestre), small-leaved lime (Tilia cordata) and wych elm (Ulmus glabra).

Ground-layer plants are dominated by bilberry (Vaccinium myrtillus), bramble (Rubus fruticosus), common bracken (Pteridium aquilinum), dog's mercury (Mercurialis perennis), false brome (Brachypodium sylvaticum), great wood-rush (Luzula sylvatica). Scarce and locally uncommon plants that are found in the gorge are narrow-leaved bittercress (Cardamine impatiens), stinking hellebore (Helleborus foetidus), wood barley (Hordelymus europaeus) and wood fescue (Festuca altissima).

Grassland areas on the site contain the uncommon bloody cranes-bill (Geranium sanguineum) as well as the nationally scarce sedge species: dwarf sedge (Carex humilis), fingered sedge (Carex digitata) and soft-leaved sedge (Carex montana).

=== Fauna ===
A wide variety of mammals populate the gorge, including badgers and fallow deer. The caves in the gorge provide a winter roost for greater horseshoe bats and lesser horseshoe bats. Birds that use the woodlands in the SSSI include buzzard, nuthatch, peregrine falcon, pied flycatcher, raven, tawny owl and the wood warbler.

Insects species found on the site include a dance fly (Hilara media) and a wasp (Omalus puncticollis), which are nationally rare; as well as uncommon butterflies: wood white, pearl-bordered fritillary and the white admiral.

== See also ==
- Lower Wye Gorge SSSI
- Wye Valley AONB
