= Haugh Wood =

Protected area in Herefordshire, England

- Site of Special Scientific Interest
- Location within Herefordshire
- Location of Haugh Wood.
- Area of search: Herefordshire
- Grid reference: SO591367
- Coordinates: 52.027195°N 2.5975288°W
- Area: 846.3 acres (3.425 km^{2}; 1.322 sq mi)
- Notification date: 1989

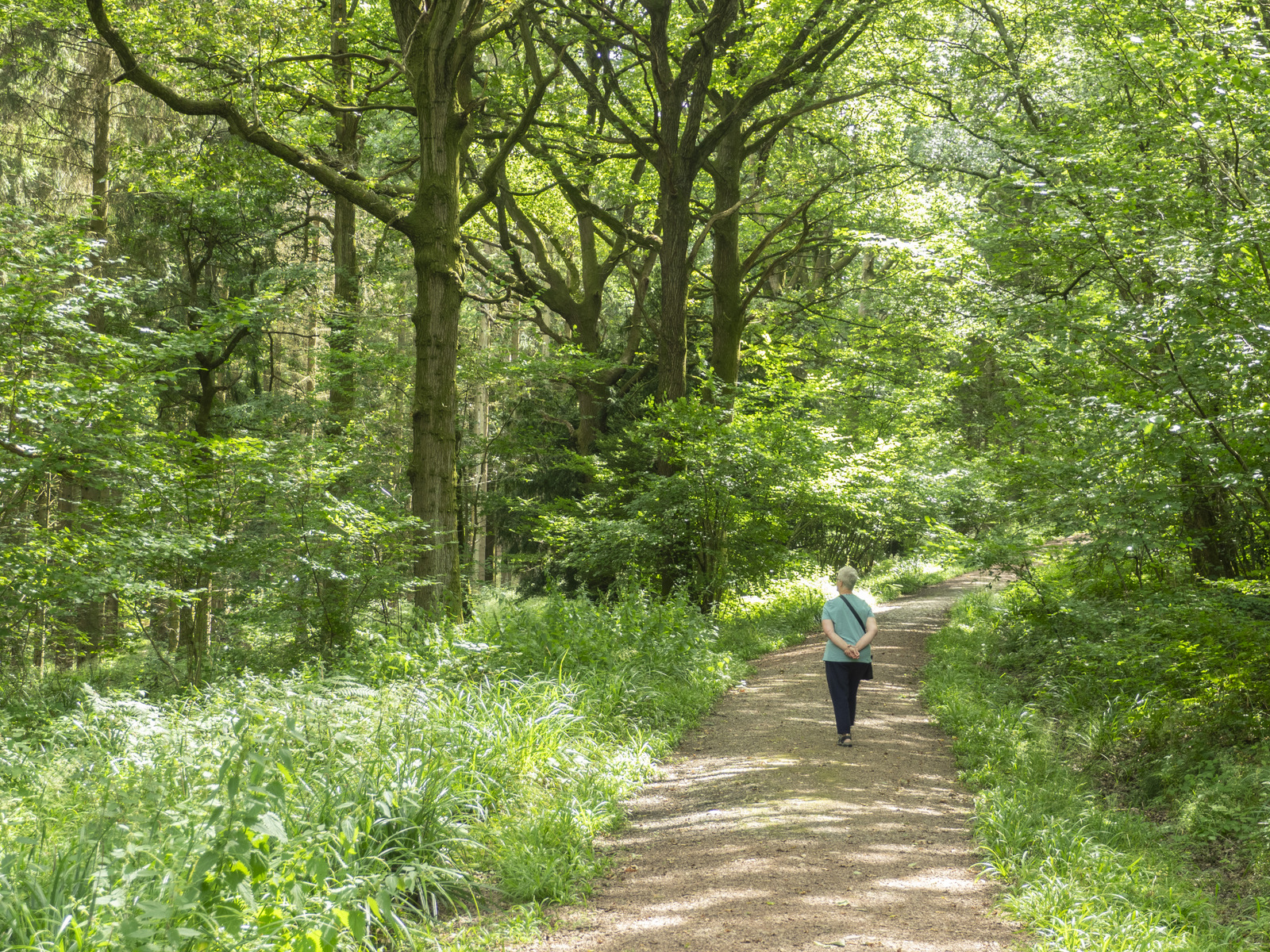
Haugh Wood

Haugh Wood is a Site of Special Scientific Interest near Woolhope in Herefordshire, England. The protected area is recognised for its diversity of its insects. The Forestry Commission has provided waymarked butterfly trails in this protected area.

This protected area includes two previously notified Sites of Special Scientific Interest called Rudge End Quarry and Pentaloe Glen.

== Biology ==
Most of Haugh wood has been converted to forestry plantation. The notable insect diversity is associated with the patches that contain sessile oak and silver birch.

Butterflies include high brown fritillary, wood white, pearl bordered fritillary and white letter hairstreak. Moth species include lunar hornet clearwing, drab looper, triple spotted pug and barred hook-tip. The bee Osmia pilicornis has also been recorded at this site.

Herbaceous plants in this protected area include herb-Paris, greater butterfly orchid, marsh helleborine, common twayblade, fragrant orchid and yellow-wort.

Mammal species in this protected area include fallow deer, badger, dormouse and pole cat.

Bird species include sparrowhawk, tawny owl, woodcock, nightingale and lesser spotted woodpecker.

== Geology ==
Haugh Wood is positioned on top of Woolhope Dome, which is composed of alternating beds of limestones and shales formed during the Silurian period.

== Land ownership and management ==
Most of the land within Haugh Wood SSSI is owned by the Forestry Commission. Haugh Wood SSSI also includes land owned by the National Trust who refer to this site as Poors Acre.

Herefordshire Wildlife Trust have a management role for some of this protected area, particularly in the sections known as Pentaloe Glen and Rudge End Quarry. Herefordshire Wildlife Trust also purchased land in 2020 to form Common Hill reserve.
