= Church of St Swithin, Ganarew =

Church in Herefordshire, England

Coordinates: 51.84356°N 2.68442°W

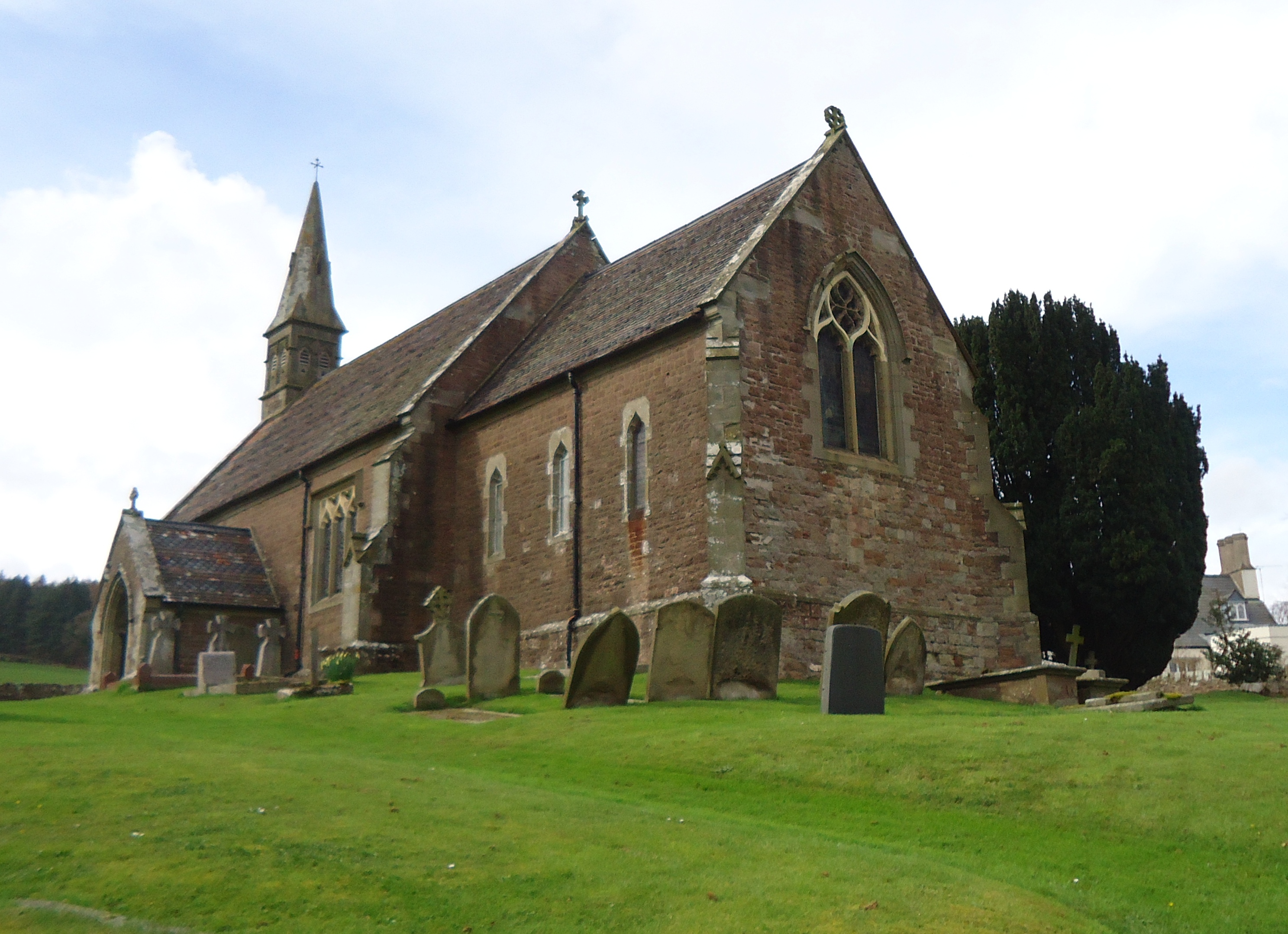
Church of St Swithin, Ganarew

The Church of St Swithin is a parish church in Ganarew, south Herefordshire, England. The parish church is dedicated to St Swithin, although the 1868 National Gazetteer notes a dedication to St Luke. The parish is within the Church of England Diocese of Hereford, and the church is a Grade II listed building.

== History ==
Giles Rawlines served as rector in 1624. Tamalanc, a son of Brychan, may be the same person as Tiuinauc (or Tywinauc or Tywannog), a patron saint connected with the Church of St Swithin's history. The church was rebuilt in about 1850 by John Prichard, a noted church builder and restorer of the Victorian period. The church required the expensive restoration because of the failing foundations.

== Architecture and fittings ==
The church is of the English Gothic architectural style, described by Pevsner as Middle Pointed or Decorated Period, and by Historic England simply as Decorated. It is built of sandstone rubble with ashlar dressings and a tiled roof. The nave has windows with hoodmoulds. They have cusped ogee-headed lights and spandrels. The bellcote has similar cusped ogee-headed openings and a small spire with decorative lucarnes.

The reredos inside the church forms the village war memorial, a sculpture in white marble featuring the figure of Christ accompanied by two angels.

== Grounds ==
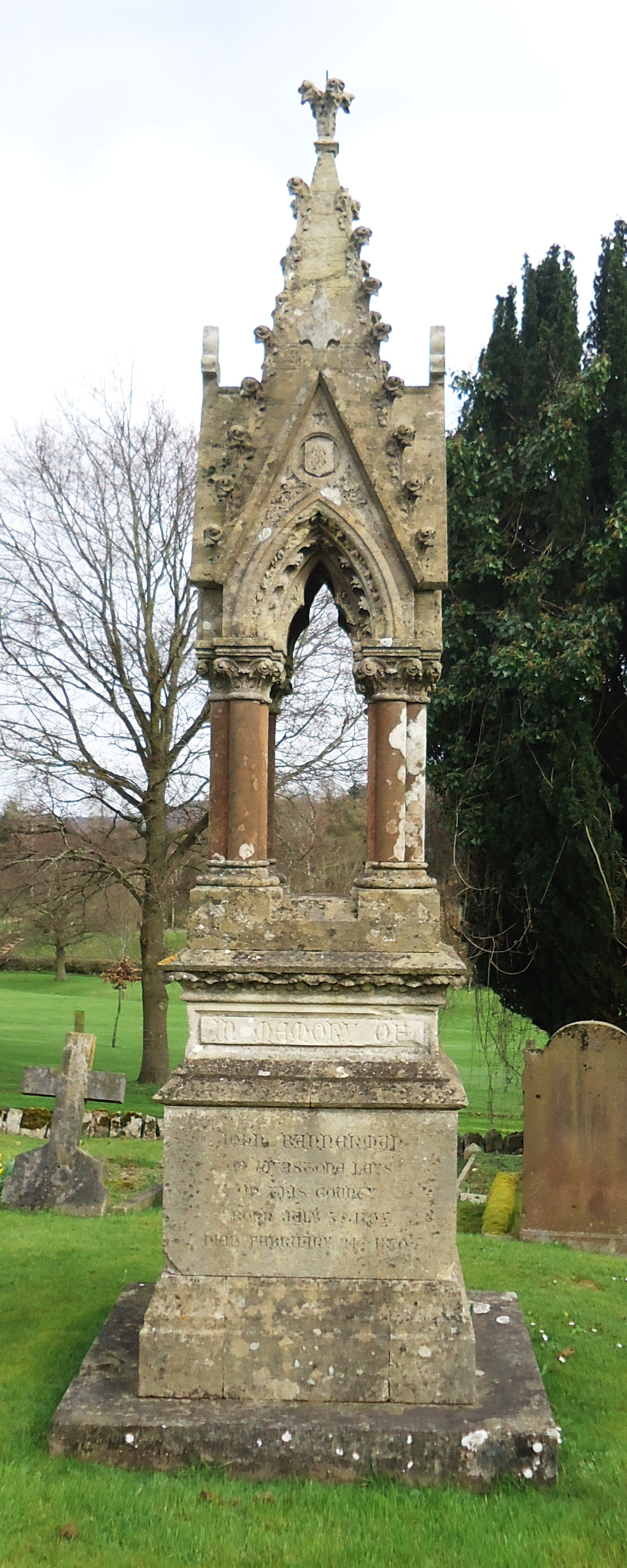
Bannerman family memorial

The graveyard contains a Gothic pinnacle memorial to the Bannerman family who lived nearby at Wyastone Leys. The medieval churchyard cross is a scheduled ancient monument. There is also a war grave of a Royal Engineers soldier of World War I.
