= Nimbus Records =

British record label

- Founded: 1972; 54 years ago (corporate establishment)
- Founder: Numa Labinsky; Michael Reynolds; Gerald Reynolds
- Genre: Classical
- Country of origin: United Kingdom
- Location: Herefordshire, England
- Official website: www.wyastone.co.uk/all-labels/nimbus.html

Nimbus Records is a British record company based at Wyastone Leys, Ganarew, Herefordshire. It specialises in classical music recordings and was the first company in the UK to produce compact discs.

== Description ==
Nimbus had its informal beginnings in Birmingham, West Midlands in 1956 and was founded as a corporate entity in 1972 by Count Numa Labinsky, who performed as a bass vocalist under the alias Shura Gehrman and brothers Michael and Gerald Reynolds.

Traditionally Nimbus Records been based at the Wyastone Leys mansion site, near Monmouth and the English/Welsh border. A core technical aspect of the company's recording philosophy was the early adoption of the Ambisonic surround-sound system invented by a group of British researchers including the mathematician and recording engineer Michael Gerzon.

The recordings have been made with a single-point array of microphones developed by Dr Jonathan Halliday, which is equivalent to a form of soundfield microphone, encoded into stereo-compatible 2-channel Ambisonic UHJ Format and released on conventional stereo media.

An Ambisonic decoder is required to experience such recordings in their truest, surround-sound, form. These have never been widely available, so Nimbus recordings are typically experienced as undecoded UHJ, which is compatible with normal stereo reproduction.

The emergence of home-theatre systems with increasing emphasis on surround playback offers opportunities for domestic listeners to experience at least some of Nimbus' many hundred Ambisonic recordings in their original condition. For example, the company has issued a series of "DVD Music" recordings in which the original 2-channel UHJ masters have been decoded to loudspeaker feeds and issued on conventional DVD-Audio/Video surround format discs. In addition, Nimbus recordings are now often recorded in Ambisonic B-Format, which can be decoded directly to a multichannel surround format compatible with conventional multichannel discs such as DVD or DTS-CD.

A large sub-label of Nimbus Records is the vocal series Prima Voce. This label specialises in the transfer of vocal records on 78 rpm disc dating from 1900. The method of transfer involves the use of thorn needles and a giant acoustic horn on a carefully restored gramophone. No electronic processing is used: instead, the gramophone is placed in a living room environment and recorded ambisonically, in surround-sound, from a typical listening position. Although controversial, the technique is capable of producing remarkably lifelike results – particularly for recordings made "acoustically" prior to the arrival of studio microphones in 1925.

Nimbus Records was the first company to master and press compact discs in the UK, and developed and sold equipment for these purposes. It became part of the Mirror Group in 1987. Following the demise of Robert Maxwell, the equipment company was spun off and the intellectual property rights to the Nimbus Records catalogue were ultimately re-acquired by the original owners under the name of Wyastone Estate Limited. Wyastone Estate operates Wyastone Business Park, Wyastone Concert Hall and the Nimbus Foundation, Nimbus Records, and Nimbus Disc On Demand. The latter is a short-run disc manufacturing capability that has enabled Nimbus Records to make virtually all its catalogue of recordings from the earliest times available to record-buyers.

In 2001 a new holding company was established, Wyastone Estate which was the umbrella over Nimbus Records, Nimbus Disc and Print, Nimbus Music Publishing, Wyastone CD Distribution and Wyastone Business Park. In 2004 Wyastone Estate opened a short run CD manufacturing plant. This enabled Nimbus Records to continue adding new titles to the catalogue without being forced to delete the back catalogue. In 2014 Nimbus Records held a catalogue of over 1500 in stock CD titles, their biggest catalogue to date. The label also presses and distributes the recordings of Lyrita.

== Artists (selected) ==
- Roy Goodman, conductor
- Martin Jones, pianist
- Vlado Perlemuter, pianist
- Bernard Roberts
- Augusta Read Thomas, composer
- George Benjamin, composer
