= The Doward =

Coordinates: 51.843°N 2.67°W

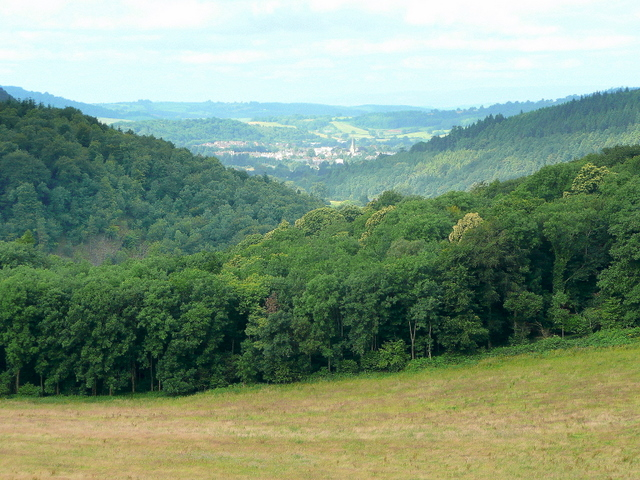
- View of Monmouth from Great Doward

- Location within Herefordshire
- Unitary authority: Herefordshire
- Ceremonial county: Herefordshire
- Region: West Midlands
- Country: England
- Sovereign state: United Kingdom
- Police: West Mercia
- Fire: Hereford and Worcester
- Ambulance: West Midlands
- UK Parliament: Hereford and South Herefordshire

The Doward (Welsh: Deuarth Fach, lit. "two small hills"), is an area in the parish of Whitchurch in south Herefordshire, England, consisting of the hills of Little Doward and Great Doward and extensive woodland. It is within the Wye Valley Area of Outstanding Natural Beauty, on the border with Monmouthshire, Wales. The area, about 3 miles (4.8 km) north-east of Monmouth, is shrouded in legend and King Arthur's Cave is in the vicinity.

== Geography ==
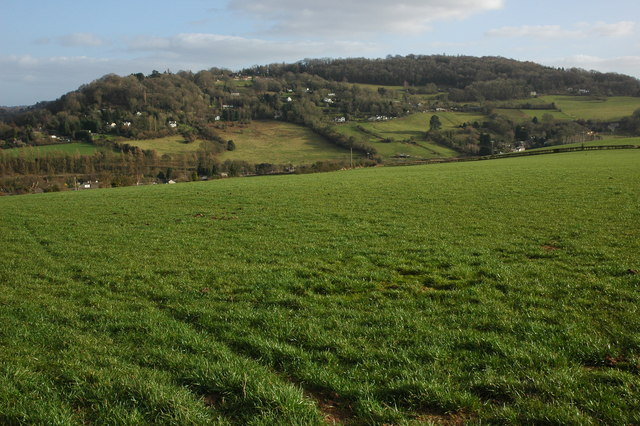
Little Doward viewed from above Whitchurch

The Doward is located in the far south of Herefordshire, just across the border from Wales. In 1854, the district was reported to be of 254 acres. Little Doward is located about 3 miles (4.8 km) from Monmouth, just to the southeast of Ganarew and just to the west of Symonds Yat. The River Wye flows through the area forming the eastern and southern boundary of the area, and the A40 road forming its western boundary. It is heavily forested with several cave formations. The landscape is mountainous common, sprinkled with rock outcrops.

The Great Doward area is marked by "extensive stratified limestone mountains" and the Great Doward Hill is said to contain "large deposits of rich iron-ore of a peculiar quality". A lane in the area is called Black Stone Kiln's Lane, indicating historical economic activity here. To the west, the area is woody with wild elevations, interspersed with tame swells and hollows. Maliscot Wood lies to the southeast of The Doward. The woodland is part of an Area of Outstanding Natural Beauty (AONB), and is protected by the Herefordshire Nature Trust.

== Landmarks ==
=== King Arthur's Cave ===
King Arthur's Cave was occupied by man during the Upper Palaeolithic era. In 1871 the caves were excavated by Reverend W. S. Symond. The cave is shrouded in local superstition and is said to have had a part in the early legend of King Vortigern, a native British king who fought against the invading Anglo Saxons.

=== Hillfort ===
Little Doward hosts a British hillfort which seems to have been refortified in the post-Roman era. Ford tentatively identified it with the Cair Guorthigirn ("Fort Vortigern") listed by Nennius among the 28 cities of Britain in his History of the Britains.

=== Wyastone Leys ===
Wyastone Leys, formerly Lays House, is located at the southwestern corner of The Doward. The original house, The Leys, was built in 1795 by S. O. Attley of London. It was purchased around 1820 by Richard Blakemore who bought the Hadnock estate on the other side of the River Wye, demolished Hadnock House, and used the materials to rebuild and extend the Leys, between 1821 and 1838. The house was rebuilt in 1861 for John Bannerman of Manchester, by William Burn. In the woodland of Little Doward Hill above the house, the Forestry Commission planted, in 1953, a pattern of trees with contrasting foliage in the shape of the letters ER, to mark the Coronation of Queen Elizabeth II.

=== Other ===
The Doward also contains several cottages. The camp has traces of three circular terraces winding in a snail mount. The Vikings once escaped via the precipice near the camp. Vaga Cottage is also of note and was home to the local reverend in the early 19th century. Other cottages include Beech Cottage, Leaping Stocks House, Lilac Cottage, and Highland Cottage near Symonds Yat. In the north of the Doward the small Biblins Bridge footbridge crosses the Wye to the Forestry Commission Biblins Youth Campsite.

== Gallery ==
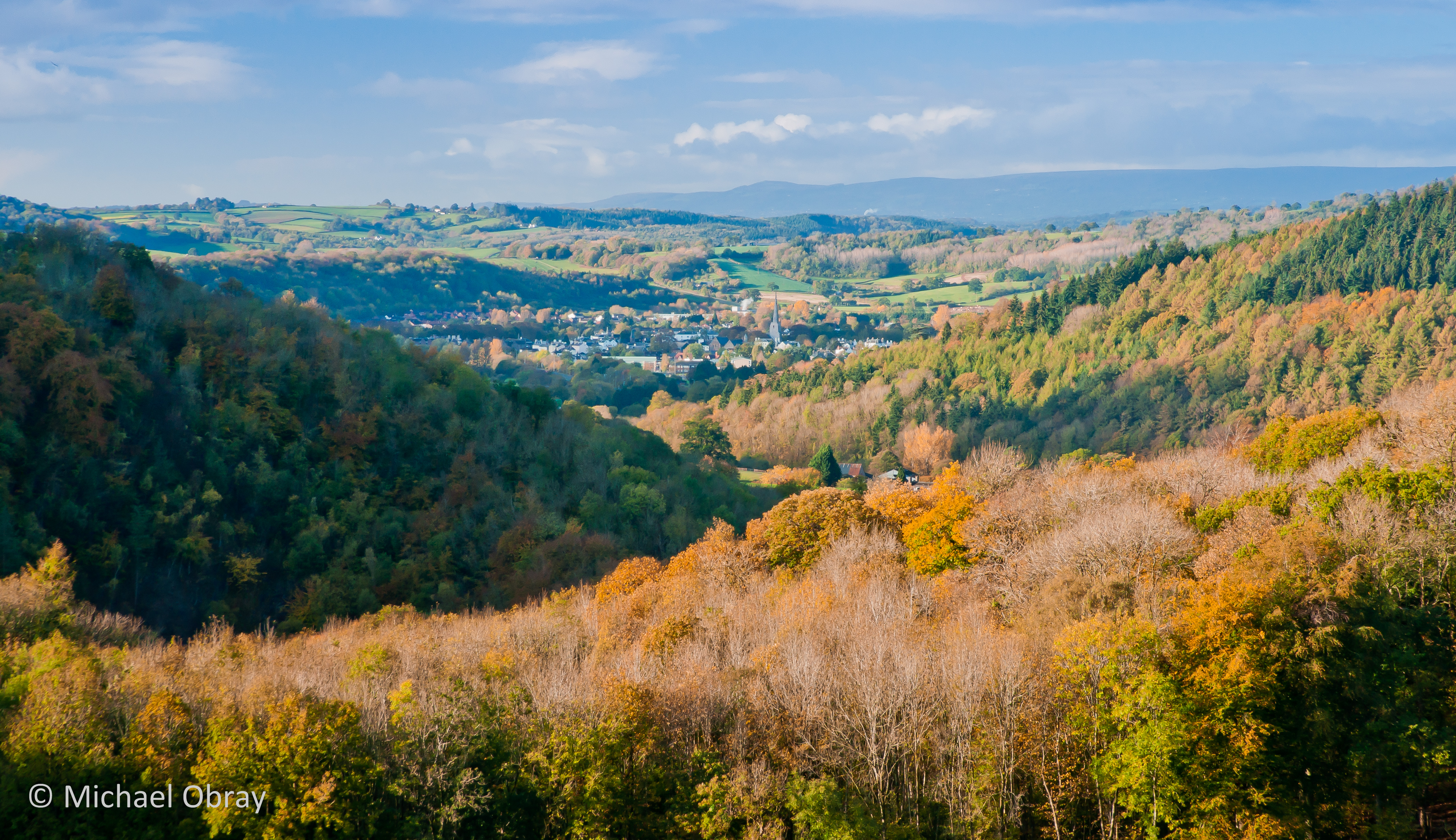
View of Monmouth from Little Doward in autumn

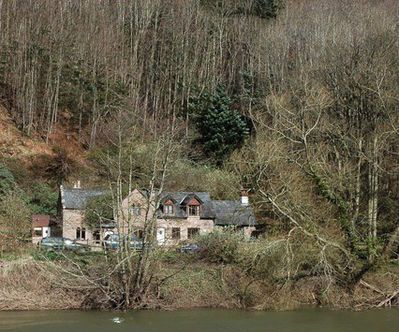
A house in the southern part of The Doward

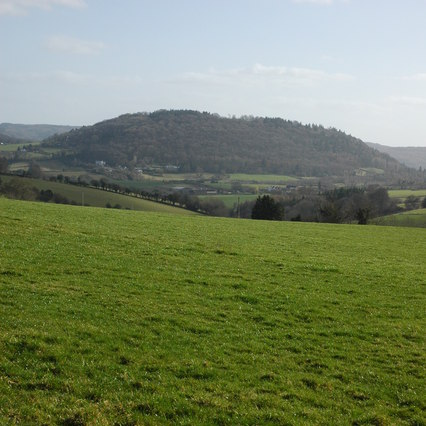
The wooded hill at Doward viewed from a footpath near Llangrove

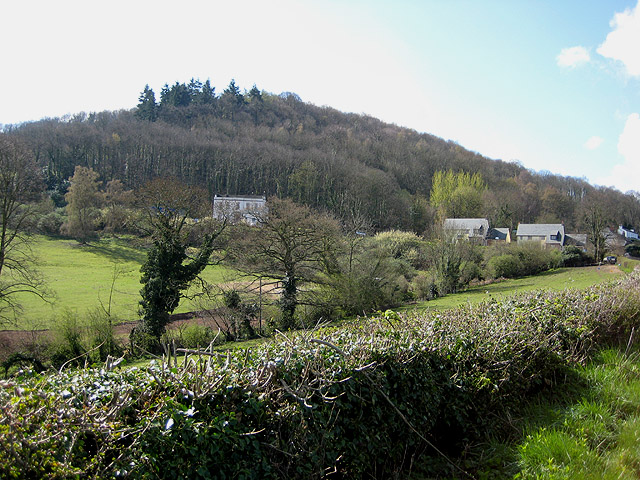
Wooded slopes of Little Doward

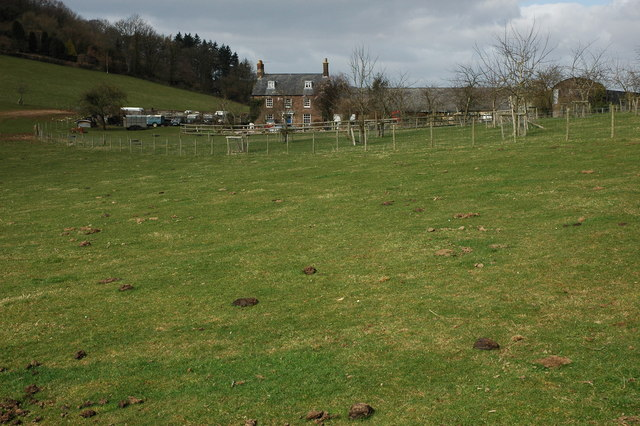
Doward Farm viewed from the south

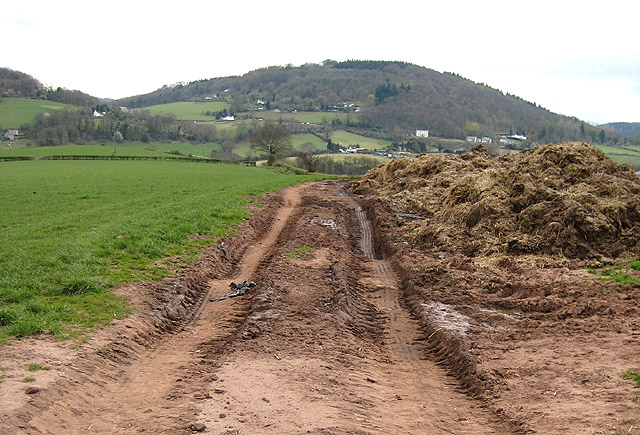
Farm track with a view of Little Doward From the Llangrove road

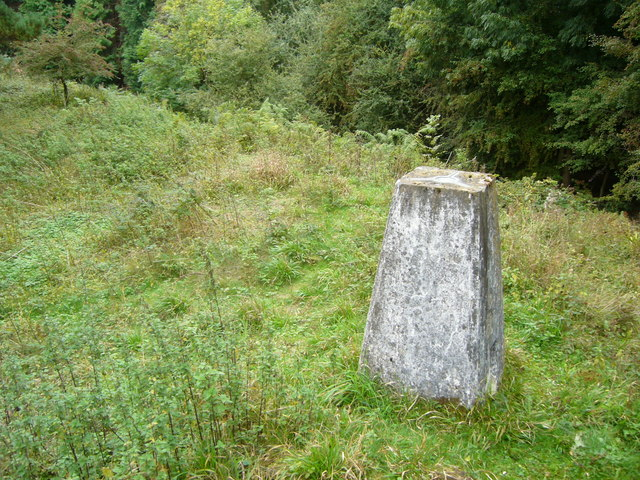
Little Doward trig point

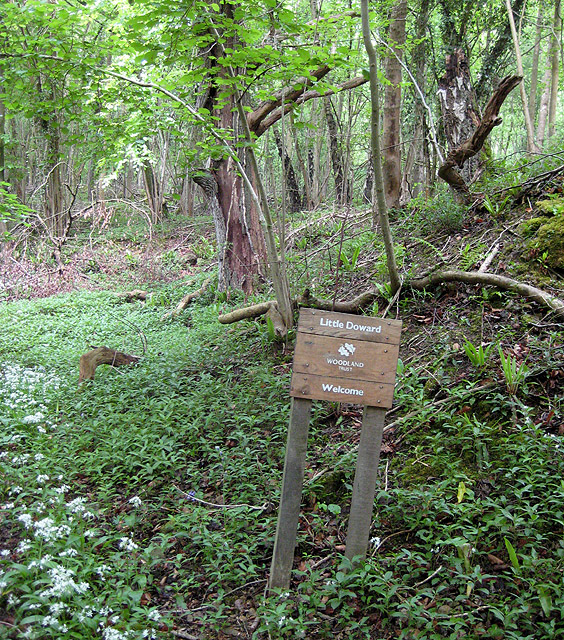
Welcome sign in Little Doward woods

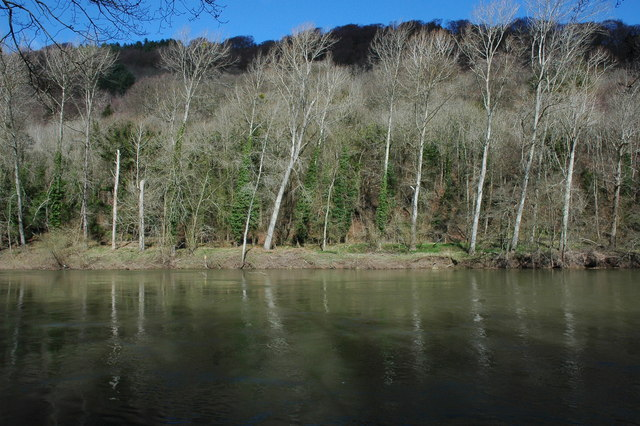
Trees on the banks of the River Wye below Little Doward

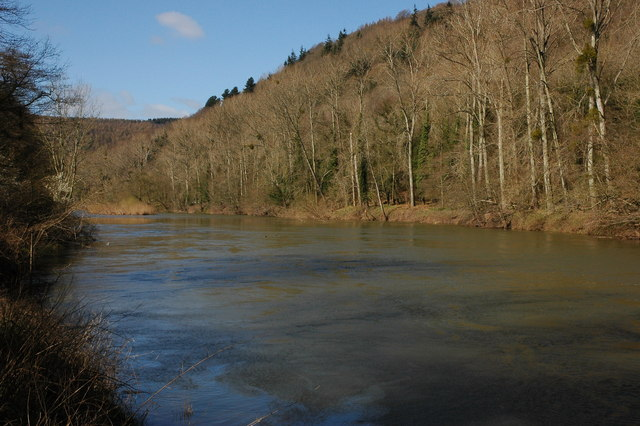
The River Wye below Little Doward

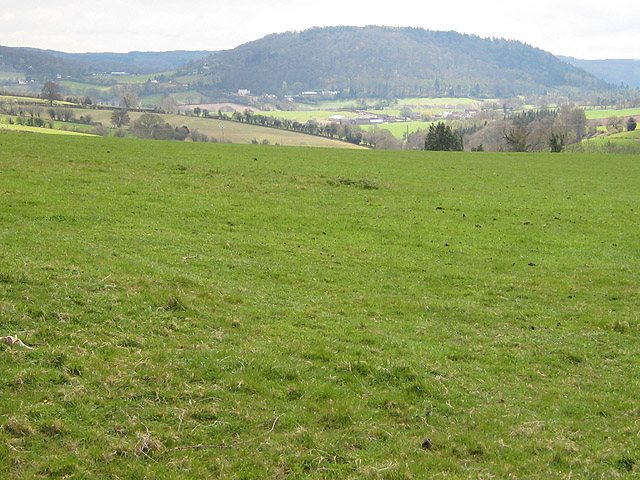
A public footpath cuts through farmland towards Little Doward
