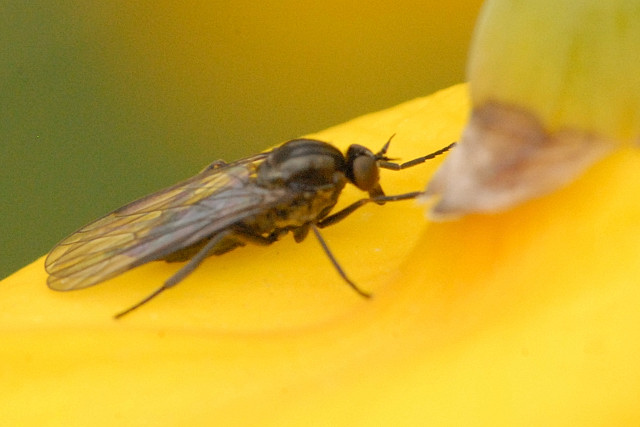

Scientific classification
- Kingdom: Animalia
- Phylum: Arthropoda
- Class: Insecta
- Order: Diptera
- Family: Empididae
- Genus: Hilara
- Species: H. interstincta

Binomial name
- Hilara interstincta (Fallén, 1816)

Synonyms
- Empis interstincta Fallén, 1816; Hilara modesta Meigen, 1822

= Hilara interstincta =

Species of fly

Hilara interstincta is a species of dance flies, in the fly family Empididae.
