= King Arthur's Cave =

Cave in Herefordshire, England

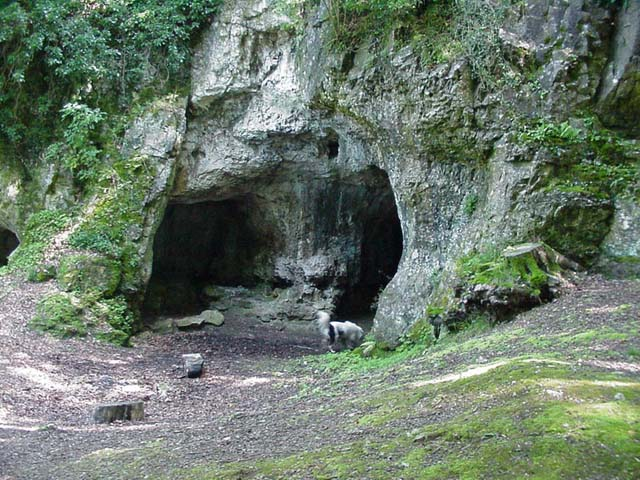
- The entrance to King Arthur's Cave
- Interactive map of King Arthur's Cave
- Location: Lord's Wood, The Doward, Symonds Yat, England
- Coordinates: 51°50′14″N 2°39′42″W

King Arthur's Cave is a limestone cave at the foot of a low cliff at the north-western end of Lord's Wood in The Doward, near Symonds Yat, Herefordshire, about four miles northeast of Monmouth, in the Wye Valley. The cave entrance lies about 285 feet above the River Wye on a hill, with a double interconnected entrance and two main chambers. It is protected as a nature reserve under the Herefordshire Nature Trust. There is evidence that the cave was occupied by man during the Upper Palaeolithic era, and flint tools and woolly mammoth bones have been unearthed within and around the caves.

== Background ==
It is uncertain exactly how the cave got its name. A skeleton of a "giant human" was supposedly discovered in the cave around 1700, but was lost when a local surgeon named Mr. Pye took the skeleton to sea on a voyage to Jamaica and his ship sank. The cave is shrouded in local superstition and is believed to have had a part in the early legend of King Vortigern, a native British king who fought against the invading Anglo Saxons. Vortigern is said to have made his last stand against Aurelius at nearby Ganarew. Lawman mentions a castle on Cloard Hill in the district of Hergin, and has Vortigern dying after the castle was besieged and fired by Aurelius and Uther. Helen Hill Miller, in her 1969 book The Realms of Arthur, suggests a military use for the cave, arguing that the cave's "recesses penetrate very far into the hill, and could hide a substantial force". The cave has a parallel with Cadbury Castle in that it is a cave within a hillfort.

== Excavations ==
In 1871 the caves were excavated by Reverend William S. Symonds, after he learned that some miners had raided them. He unearthed hyena, lion, brown bear, red deer, rhinoceros, Irish Elk, reindeer, and horse bones dated to the Late Pleistocene. The evidence of hyena was particularly prominent and many of the bones showed signs of being crunched by them. He also found flint implements from the Upper Palaeolithic and fragments of Neolithic pottery.

Members of the Cotswold Naturalists' Field Club also explored the caves, under the supervision of the Reverend Symonds, which led to further remarkable discoveries. They initially inspected one of the Doward caves, situated about 200 yards from King Arthur's Cave:

Before the excavations were commenced this cave was so nearly closed up with refuse matter that had apparently been washed there, that it was a difficult undertaking to obtain an entry. On removing the debris, a stalactitic floor, about six inches in thickness, was found, under which were discovered the bones of fowls, sheep, pigs, &c. About five feet below this layer was discovered a large forearm bone of an elephant, embedded in clay and vegetable matter. In this cave was also found the head of a Roman ox in contiquity with the remains of beavers, but no pebbles were found. In a cave situate between this cave and King Arthur's, a Roman ox jaw was brought to the surface, the teeth of which were in a very fine state of preservation. The party, after inspecting the various parts of the caves where these remains had been found, next visited King Arthur's Cave, which, in reality, consists of two caves or holes, with a long passage, one of which the club have named The Bear's Den, and the other The Lion's Cave. In the former, after excavating 22 feet below the surface, the bones of the beaver, badger, roedeer, wolf, and reindeer have been found. Proceeding farther inwards, for which purpose the cave was lighted up with candles, a most remarkable discovery, made by the Rev. Wm. Symonds, was pointed out to the company by that gentleman. An excavation of about 10 feet in depth had been made in the floor of the cave, wherein was revealed the extraordinary section alluded to, the formation being of river sand and pebbles, situate between two stalactitic floors. Resting upon the first floor, or upper formation, mixed with earth, were found the bones of extinct animals.

Between 1925 and 1927 the University of Bristol Spelæological Society (UBSS) excavated here, and in 1926 Garrod dated his findings in the upper cave to the Upper Palaeolithic and those from the lower cave to the Middle Palaeolithic. The society returned in 1955 but found nothing new. In 1989, the caves and the Upper Wye Gorge of some 1.5 hectares (3.7 acres) was designated a SSSI.

== Structure ==
The cave is said to "consist of a broad entrance platform, a double interconnected entrance and two main chambers", about 300 feet above the River Wye. One of the chambers is large and circular in shape, about 25 feet in diameter. The main chambers obtained the names Bear's Den and Lion's Cave due to the paleontological items found there. There are also several other open rooms to the cave.
