= Ganarew =

Village in Herefordshire, England

Coordinates: 51.843°N 2.683°W

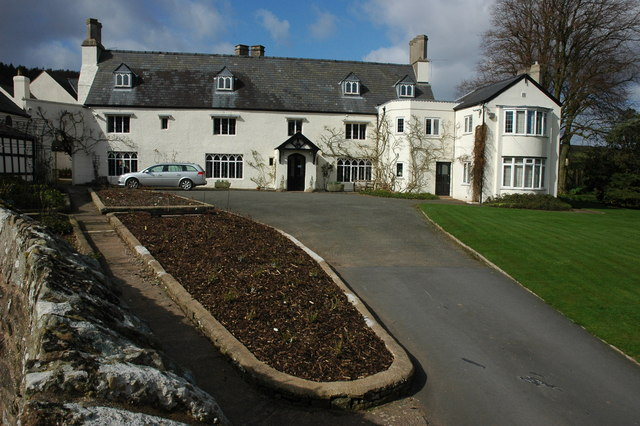
- Ganarew Manor

- Location within Herefordshire
- Population: 171 (2011)
- Unitary authority: Herefordshire
- Ceremonial county: Herefordshire
- Region: West Midlands
- Country: England
- Sovereign state: United Kingdom
- Post town: Monmouth
- Postcode district: NP25
- Dialling code: 01600
- Police: West Mercia
- Fire: Hereford and Worcester
- Ambulance: West Midlands
- UK Parliament: Hereford and South Herefordshire

Ganarew (from Welsh: Genau'r Rhiw; 'Gana-rhiw', and 'Gan y rew') is a village and small civil parish in south Herefordshire, England near the River Wye and the border with Wales. The village is located 0.62 miles (1.00 km) southwest of the village of Whitchurch on the main A40 road, and lies within the electoral ward of Kerne Bridge. The village is about 2 miles (3.2 km) from Monmouth and 8 miles (13 km) from Ross-on-Wye. It contains the Church of St Swithin and Ganarew Manor.

== History ==
The name Gana-rhiw, now Ganarew, may derive from the Briton "gan", from genau, meaning "a mouth or opening of a pass"; "rhiw" is a Welsh word for "hill" or "slope".

The Imperial Gazetteer of 1855 recorded Ganarew's population as 147, and that it was 835 acres (338 ha) in size. In 1868, the National Gazetteer noted that there was an observatory, 70 feet (21 m) high, on the summit of nearby Little Doward Hill (or Ganarew Hill), from the top of which a view could be obtained of the Bristol Channel. By 1904, The Survey Gazetteer recorded the population as 132, and that there were 848 acres (343 ha).

=== Legend ===
King Vortigern is said to have made his last stand against Aurelius at Ganarew. Lawman calls it a castle on Cloard Hill in the district of Hergin, and has Vortigern dying after the castle was besieged and fired by Aurelianus and Uther Pendragon.

A cave, at nearby Little Doward, known as "King Arthur's Cave" can be explored, making it unique amongst candidates for the Arthurian cave legend. Helen Hill Miller in her 1969 The Realms of Arthur, suggests a military use for the cave, arguing that the cave's "recesses penetrate very far into the hill, and could hide a substantial force". The cave has a parallel with Cadbury Castle in that it is a cave within a hillfort. It was first inhabited in the Old Stone Age and is thus older than any other Arthurian site.

== Geography ==
Ganarew is located in the far south of Herefordshire, just across the border from Wales. Ganarew is located about 2 miles (3.2 km) from Monmouth and 8 miles (13 km) from Ross-on-Wye. The River Wye flows to the southeast of the village. Little Doward and Great Doward lie to the east. Woods in the area include Sanger Wood, Millennium Wood, Hazel Wood and Goldsmith's Wood to the south.

== Notable landmarks ==
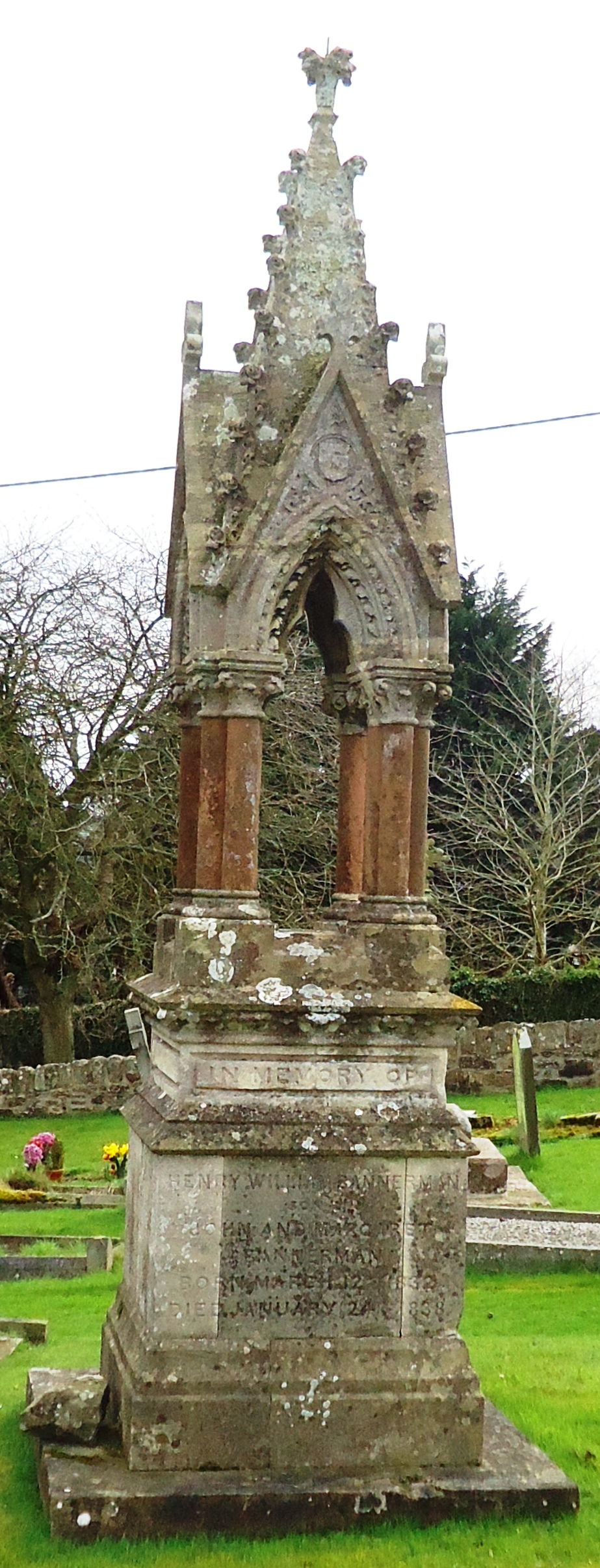
Gothic monument in the churchyard

=== Church of St Swithin ===
The parish church, which is within the Church of England Diocese of Hereford, is dedicated to St Swithin. A Grade II listed building, it was rebuilt in about 1850 by John Prichard. The graveyard contains a Gothic pinnacle memorial to the Bannerman family who lived nearby at Wyastone Leys.

=== Ganarew Manor ===
The manor dates from the 17th century, with mid-19th and early-20th-century alterations. The house is of stone with a slate roof, the 20th century extensions including a two-storey block with a bay window and a gabled porch. The manor was the home of Sir Colin Sheperd, former Member of Parliament for Hereford and is a Grade II listed building. The gate to the manor, with accompanying piers, is also a Grade II listed structure.

=== Ancient monuments ===
The Church of St Swithin churchyard contains a standing stone cross, of stepped form, which is a scheduled historical monument. It is principally medieval with some later additions and includes the foundation, the base of two steps and a socket stone. The shaft, knop and head are modern.

Other ancient monuments are noted by English Heritage at Ganarew Cross, and at Little Doward camp, the remains of an Iron Age hillfort. The Wye Valley Walk passes close to the south of the camp.

== Transport ==
In 1755 a road was constructed from Monnow Bridge to Gan y rew. In the late 18th century, the turnpike route to Ross in the area of Ganarew Hill was described as being in such bad condition that it was a travel danger. The Hereford Trust took over road work for the section between Old Forge and Ganarew in 1819. Plans in the early 19th century to build a connecting road between St Weonards and Ganarew were not carried out.
