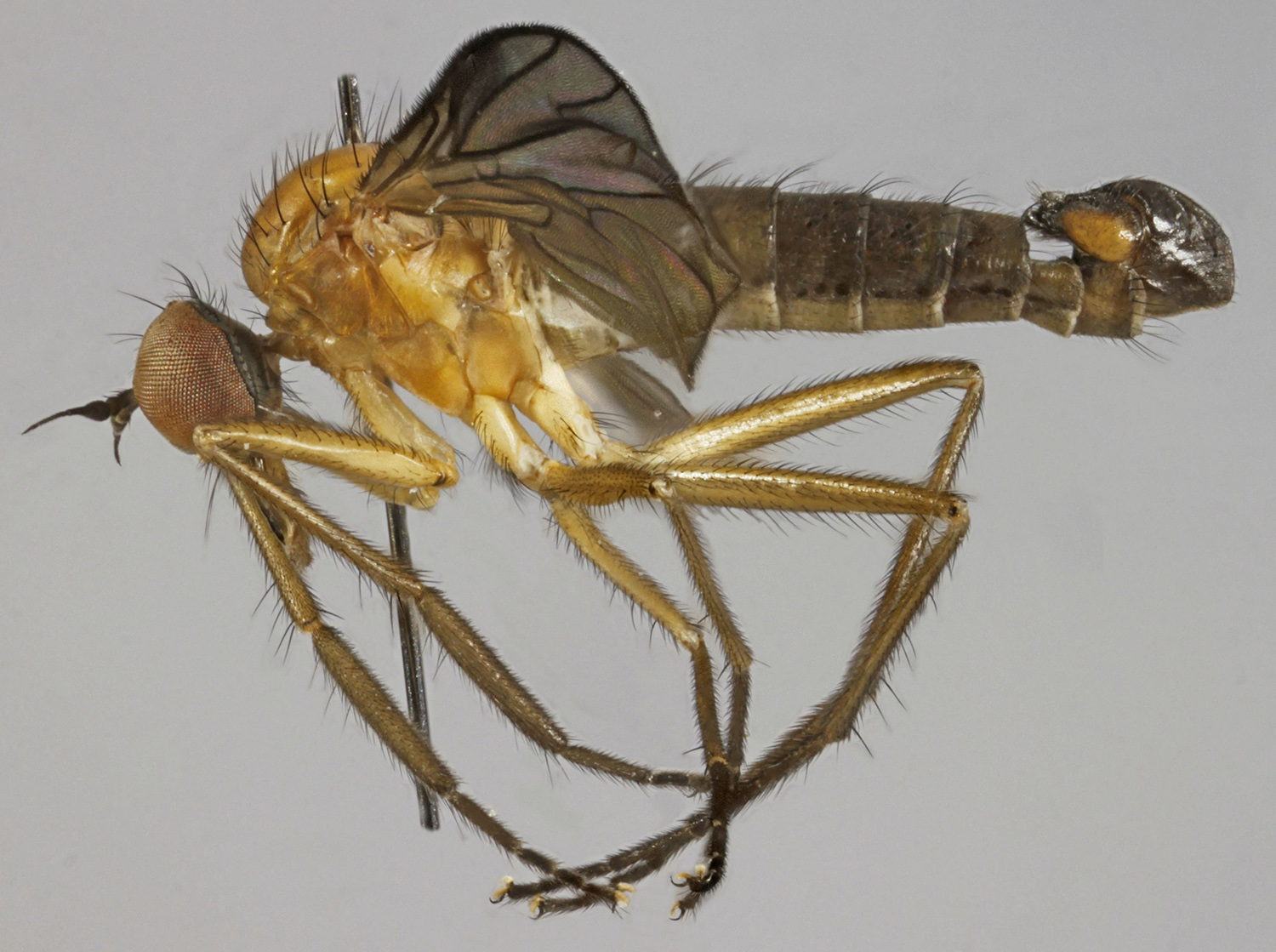
- Hilara thoracica North Wales

Scientific classification
- Kingdom: Animalia
- Phylum: Arthropoda
- Class: Insecta
- Order: Diptera
- Family: Empididae
- Genus: Hilara
- Species: H. thoracica

Binomial name
- Hilara thoracica Macquart, 1827

= Hilara thoracica =

Species of fly

Hilara thoracica is a species of fly in the family Empididae. It is found in the Palearctic.
