= Hilara laureae =

Scientific classification
- Kingdom: Animalia
- Phylum: Arthropoda
- Class: Insecta
- Order: Diptera
- Family: Empididae
- Genus: Hilara
- Species: H. laureae

Binomial name
- Hilara laureae Becker, 1908

Species of fly

Hilara laureae is a species of dance flies, in the fly family Empididae. The species was first described from Tenerife in the Canary Islands by Theodor Becker, where it is believed to be endemic.

== Etymology ==
The original spelling given by Becker (1908: 42) is "laureae", with the species epithet possibly reflecting where the species was first found in a "laurel grove" (in original german as "im Lorbeerhain"). However, subsequently many online sources give the spelling of the species epithet as the later alternative "laurae" without any apparent justification.
