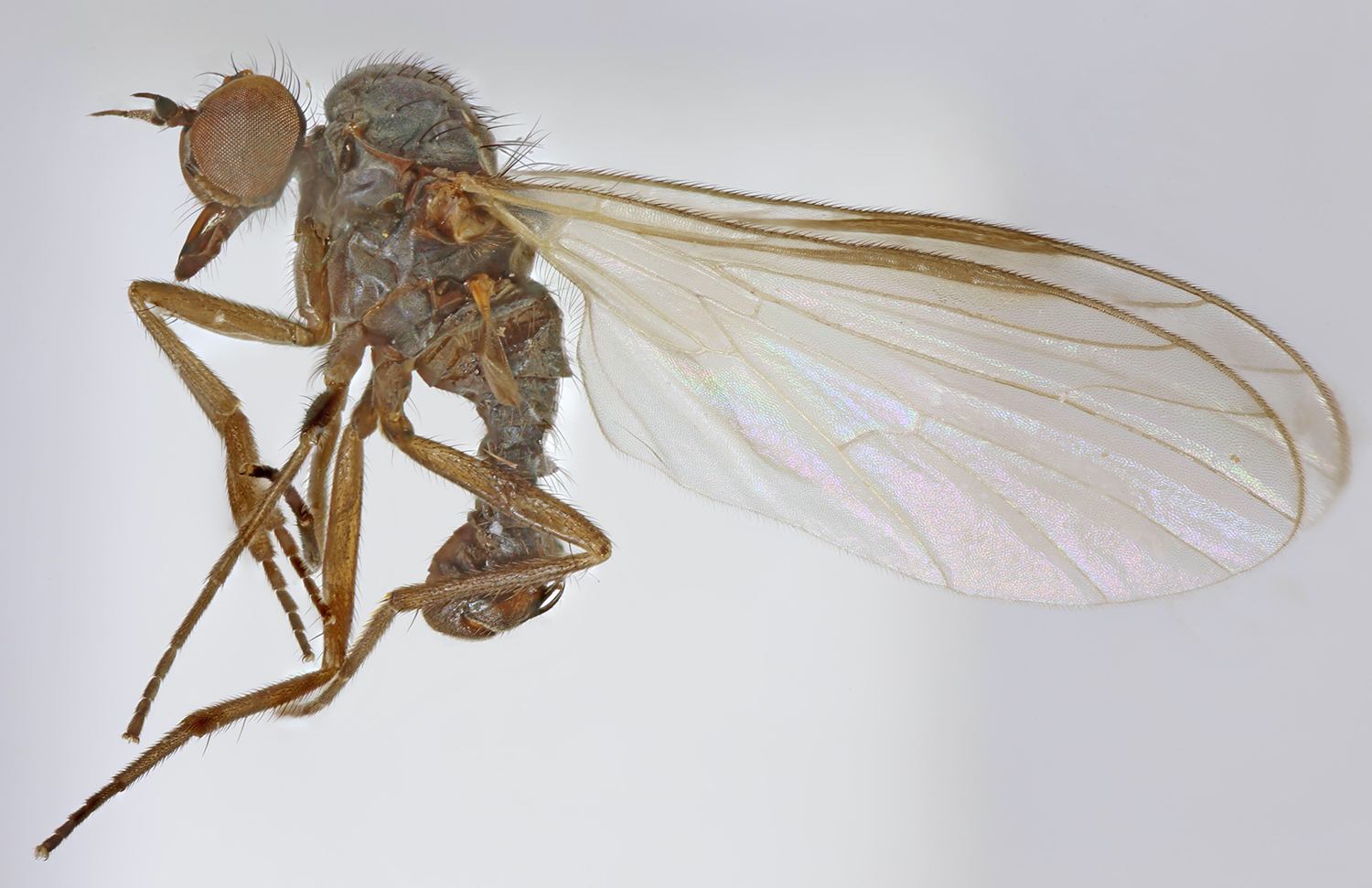
- Hilara galactoptera North Wales

Scientific classification
- Kingdom: Animalia
- Phylum: Arthropoda
- Class: Insecta
- Order: Diptera
- Family: Empididae
- Genus: Hilara
- Species: H. galactoptera

Binomial name
- Hilara galactoptera Strobl, 1910

= Hilara galactoptera =

Species of fly

Hilara galactoptera is a species of fly in the family Empididae. It is found in the Palearctic.
