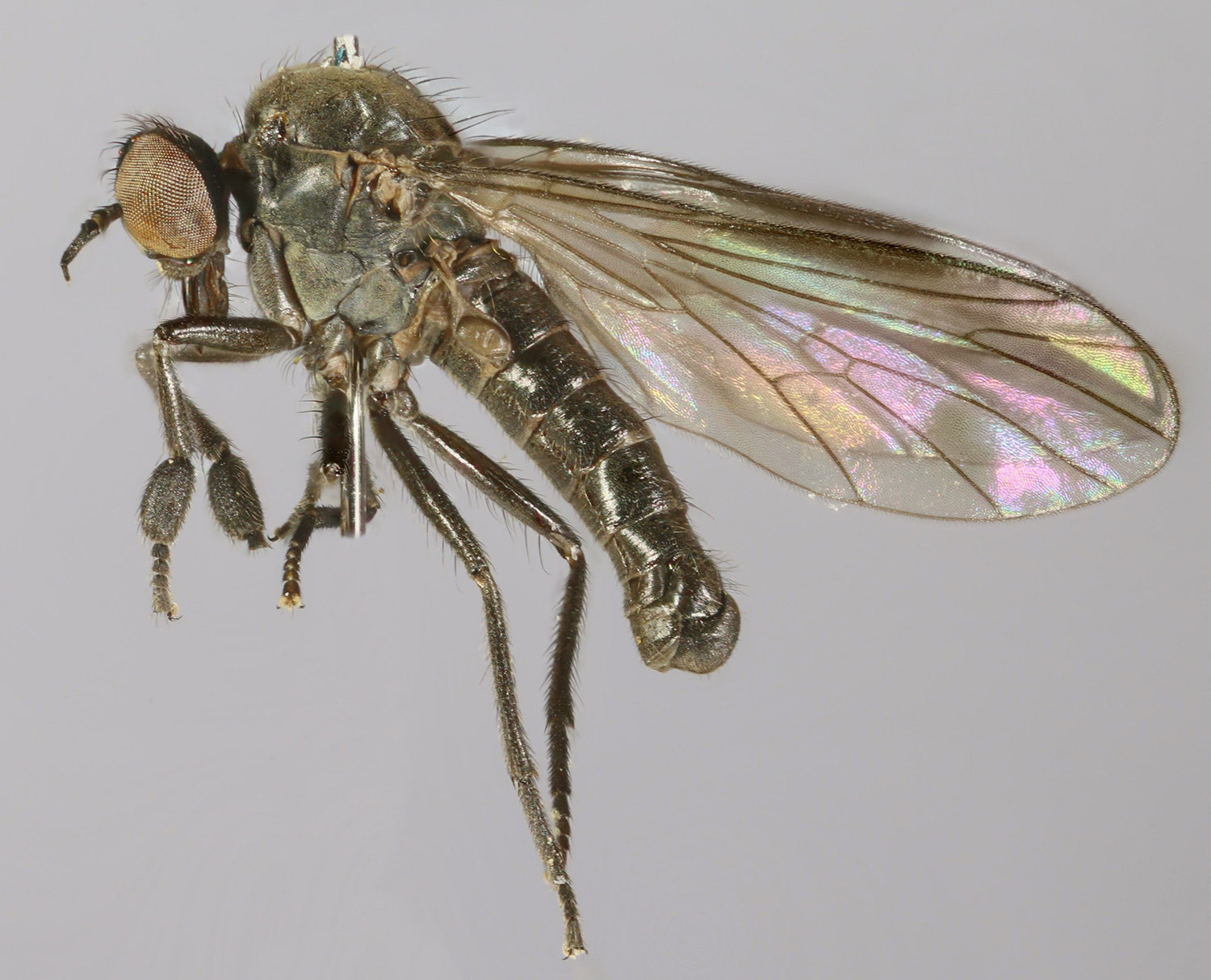
- Hilara brevistyla North Wales

Scientific classification
- Kingdom: Animalia
- Phylum: Arthropoda
- Class: Insecta
- Order: Diptera
- Family: Empididae
- Genus: Hilara
- Species: H. brevistyla

Binomial name
- Hilara brevistyla Collin, 1927

= Hilara brevistyla =

Species of fly

Hilara brevistyla is a species of fly in the family Empididae. It is found in the Palearctic.
