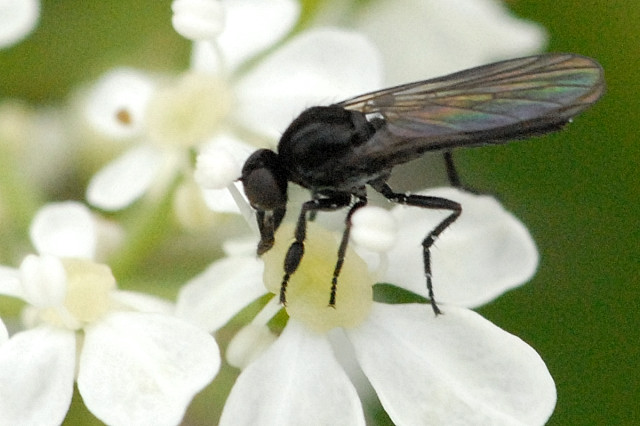
- Hilara interstincta

Scientific classification
- Kingdom: Animalia
- Phylum: Arthropoda
- Clade: Pancrustacea
- Class: Insecta
- Order: Diptera
- Family: Empididae
- Subfamily: Empidinae
- Genus: Hilara; Meigen, 1822

Type species
- Empis maura Fabricius, 1776

= Hilara =

Genus of flies

Hilara is a genus of dance flies, in the fly family Empididae.

== Species ==
- H. aartseni Chvála, 1997
- H. abdominalis Zetterstedt, 1838
- H. aeronetha Mik, 1892
- H. albanica Engel, 1943
- H. albipennis von Roser, 1840
- H. albitarsis von Roser, 1840
- H. albiventris von Roser, 1840
- H. algecirasensis Strobl, 1899
- H. allogastra Chvála, 2001
- H. almeriensis Strobl, 1906
- H. alpicola Chvála, 2001
- H. andermattensis Strobl, 1892
- H. anglodanica Lundbeck, 1913
- H. angustifrons Strobl, 1892
- H. apta Collin, 1927
- H. arkhyziensis Kustov, Shamshev and Grootaert, 2013
- H. arnaudi Niesiolowski, 1991
- H. barbipes Frey, 1908
- H. beckeri Strobl, 1892
- H. biseta Collin, 1927
- H. bistriata Zetterstedt, 1842
- H. bohemica Straka, 1976
- H. borealis Oldenberg, 1916
- H. brevipilosa Collin, 1966
- H. brevistyla Collin, 1927
- H. brevivittata Macquart, 1827
- H. caerulescens Oldenberg, 1916
- H. calinota Collin, 1969
- H. campinosensis Niesiolowski, 1986
- H. canescens Zetterstedt, 1849
- H. cantabrica Strobl, 1899
- H. caucasica Kustov, Shamshev and Grootaert, 2013
- H. chorica (Fallén, 1816)
- H. cilipes Meigen, 1822
- H. cineracea Niesiolowski, 1986
- H. cinereomicans Strobl, 1892
- H. clavipes (Harris, 1776)
- H. clypeata Meigen, 1822
- H. coracina Oldenberg, 1916
- H. cornicula Loew, 1873
- H. cuneata Loew, 1873
- H. curtisi Collin, 1927
- H. curvipes Siebke, 1864
- H. czernyi Strobl, 1909
- H. dalmatina Strobl, 1898
- H. deltaica Parvu, 1994
- H. deryae Ciftci & Hasenbli, 2011
- H. dimidiata Strobl, 1892
- H. discalis Chvála, 1997
- H. discoidalis Lundbeck, 1910
- H. discolor Strobl, 1892
- H. diversipes Strobl, 1892
- H. empidoides Frey, 1958
- H. escorialensis Strobl, 1909
- H. eviana Straka, 1976
- H. femorella Zetterstedt, 1842
- H. flavidipes Chvála, 1997
- H. flavipes Meigen, 1822
- H. flavitarsis Straka, 1976
- H. flavocoxa Straka, 1976
- H. flavohalterata Strobl, 1898
- H. fulvibarba Strobl, 1899
- H. fuscipes (Fabricius, 1794)
- H. fusitibia Strobl, 1899
- H. galactoptera Strobl, 1910
- H. gallica (Meigen, 1804)
- H. gooti Chvála, 1999
- H. griseifrons Collin, 1927
- H. griseola Zetterstedt, 1838
- H. hasankoci Ciftci & Hasenbli, 2011
- H. helvetica Chvála, 1999
- H. hirta Strobl, 1892
- H. hirtella Collin, 1927
- H. hirtipes Collin, 1927
- H. hudsoni Hutton, 1901
- H. hybrida Collin, 1961
- H. hyposeta Straka, 1967
- H. hystrix Strobl, 1892
- H. implicata Collin, 1927
- H. infuscata Brullé, 1832
- H. intermedia (Fallén, 1816)
- H. interstincta (Fallén, 1816)
- H. joannae Niesiolowski, 1991
- H. lacteipennis Strobl, 1892
- H. lapponica Chvála, 2002
- H. lasiochira Strobl, 1892
- H. lasiopa Strobl, 1892
- H. laureae Becker, 1908
- H. lindbergi Vaillant, 1963
- H. litorea (Fallén, 1816)
- H. longeciliata Strobl, 1906
- H. longesetosa Strobl, 1910
- H. longicornis Strobl, 1894
- H. longivittata Zetterstedt, 1842
- H. lugubris (Zetterstedt, 1819)
- H. lundbecki Frey, 1913
- H. lurida (Fallén, 1816)
- H. macedonica Engel, 1941
- H. macquarti Straka, 1984
- H. magica Mik, 1887
- H. maior Strobl, 1910
- H. manicata Meigen, 1822
- H. marginipennis Strobl, 1909
- H. martini Chvála, 1981
- H. matroniformis Strobl, 1892
- H. maura (Fabricius, 1776)
- H. medeteriformis Collin, 1961
- H. media Collin, 1927
- H. merula Collin, 1927
- H. merzi Chvála, 1999
- H. miriptera Straka, 1976
- H. monedula Collin, 1927
- H. morata Collin, 1927
- H. morenae Strobl, 1899
- H. mroga Niesiolowski, 1986
- H. nadolna Niesiolowski, 1986
- H. nigrina (Fallén, 1816)
- H. nigritarsis Zetterstedt, 1838
- H. nigrocincta Meijere, 1935
- H. nigrohirta Collin, 1927
- H. nitidorella Chvála, 1997
- H. nitidula Zetterstedt, 1838
- H. novakii Mik, 1892
- H. obscura Meigen, 1822
- H. palmarum Strobl, 1906
- H. pectinipes Strobl, 1892
- H. perversa Oldenberg, 1916
- H. pilipes Zetterstedt, 1838
- H. pilosa Zetterstedt, 1842
- H. pilosopectinata Strobl, 1892
- H. platyura Loew, 1873
- H. ponti Chvála, 1982
- H. primula Collin, 1927
- H. pruinosa Wiedemann in Meigen, 1822
- H. psammophytophilia Beschovski, 1973
- H. pseguashae Kustov, Shamshev and Grootaert, 2013
- H. pseudochorica Strobl, 1892
- H. pseudocornicula Strobl, 1909
- H. pseudosartrix Strobl, 1892
- H. pulchripes Frey, 1913
- H. quadriclavata Strobl, 1899
- H. quadrifaria Strobl, 1892
- H. quadrifasciata Chvála, 2002
- H. quadriseta Collin, 1927
- H. quadrula Chvála, 2002
- H. recedens Walker, 1851
- H. regneali Parvu, 1991
- H. rejecta Collin, 1927
- H. sartor Becker, 1888
- H. scrobiculata Loew, 1873
- H. setosa Collin, 1927
- H. simplicipes Strobl, 1892
- H. splendida Straka, 1976
- H. strakai Chvála, 1981
- H. strakaiana Parvu, 1993
- H. sturmii Wiedemann in Meigen, 1822
- H. styriaca Strobl, 1893
- H. submaura Collin, 1927
- H. subpollinosa Collin, 1927
- H. sulcitarsis Strobl, 1892
- H. tanychira Strobl, 1892
- H. tanythrix Frey, 1913
- H. tarsata Siebke, 1864
- H. tatra Niesiolowski, 1991
- H. tenella (Fallén, 1816)
- H. tenuinervis Zetterstedt, 1838
- H. ternovensis Strobl, 1898
- H. tetragramma Loew, 1873
- H. thoracica Macquart, 1827
- H. tiefii Strobl, 1892
- H. treheni Niesiolowski, 1991
- H. trigemina Strobl, 1909
- H. tyrolensis Strobl, 1892
- H. veletica Chvála, 1981
- H. veltmani Chvála, 1999
- H. veneta Collin, 1966
- H. vistula Niesiolowski, 1991
- H. vltavensis Straka, 1976
- H. woodiella Chvála, 1999
- H. zermattensis Chvála, 1999
