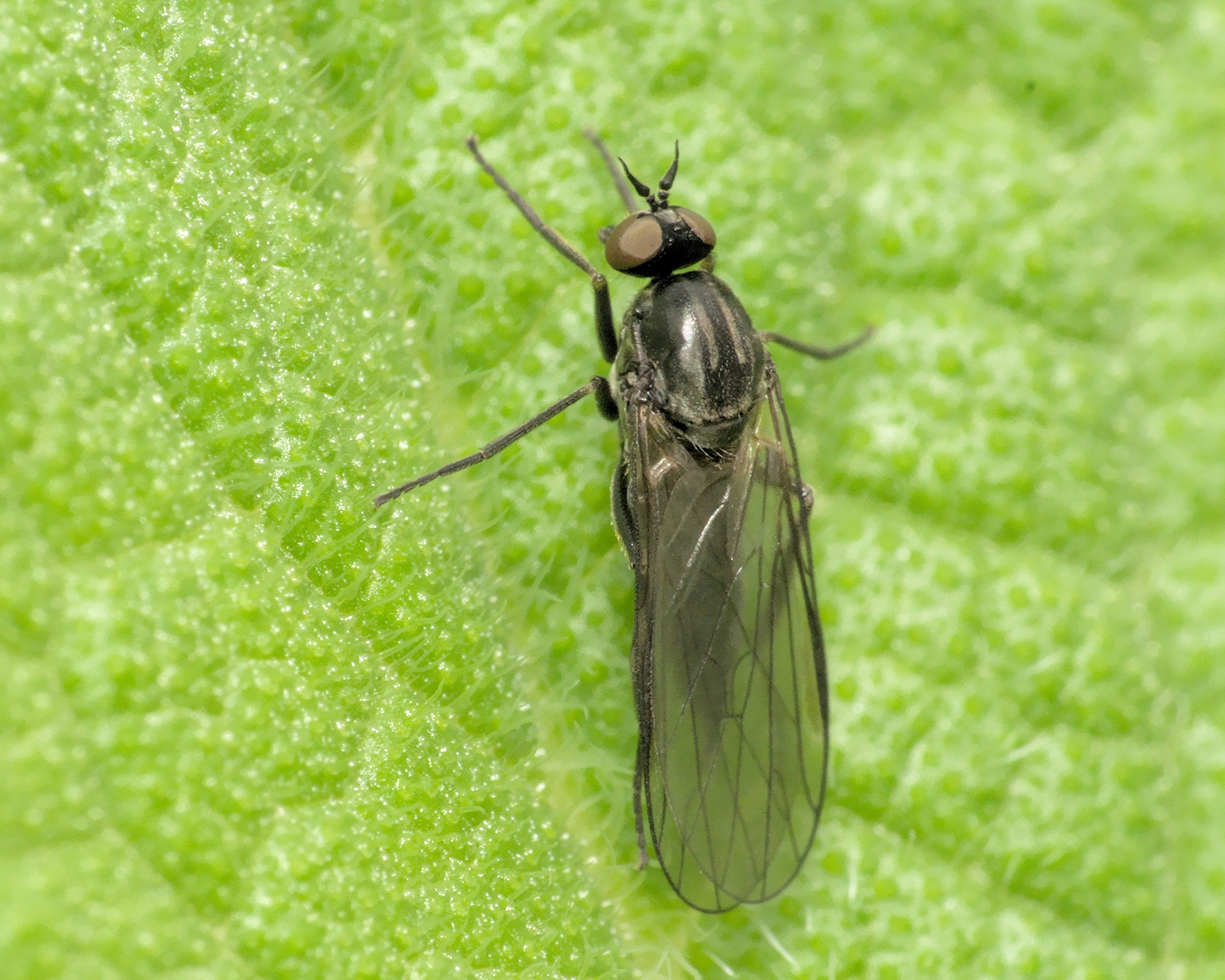
- Hilara maura

Scientific classification
- Kingdom: Animalia
- Phylum: Arthropoda
- Clade: Pancrustacea
- Class: Insecta
- Order: Diptera
- Family: Empididae
- Genus: Hilara
- Species: H. maura

Binomial name
- Hilara maura (Fabricius, 1776)

Synonyms
- Empis maura Fallén, 1816; Hilara globulipes Meigen, 1822

= Hilara maura =

Species of fly

Hilara maura is a species of dance fly, in the fly family Empididae.
