= Dinmore Hill Woods =

Protected area in Herefordshire, England

Dinmore Hill Woods is a designated Site of Special Scientific Interest in Herefordshire, England. It is an extensive area of mixed native broadleaved woodlands overlying rocks of the Old Red Sandstone. It forms one of the largest continuous blocks of deciduous woodland in this part of Herefordshire. The soils which range from acid to alkaline and front wet to dry gives rise to a diverse woodland structure.

Most of the upper plateau is dominated by sessile oak (Quercus petraea) woodland. In some areas this is associated with field maple (Acer campestre) and in others with ash (Fraxinus excelsior). Other species include hazel (Corylus avellana) and the locally rare wild service tree (Sorbus torminalis). In the woodland on the slopes, ash tends to become more dominant, often in association with birch (Betula pendula) on the drier areas and alder (Alnus glutinosa) in the wetter areas. In the south eastern part of the site is an extensive area of wild cherry (Prunus avium) and ash with a hawthorn (Crataegus monogyna) and hazel understorey.

The variety of soils give rise to a similarly diverse ground flora which includes bluebell (Hyacinthoides non-scripta), great butterfly orchid (Platanthera chlorantha) and common spotted-orchid (Dactylorhiza fuchsii), stinking iris (Iris foetidissima) and spurge laurel (Daphne laureola). The woods have a rich fauna which includes fallow deer (Dama dama). They provide an excellent habitat for birds that breed in woodland such as buzzard (Buteo buteo), great spotted woodpecker (Dendrocopos major) and tree creeper (Certhia familiaris).

== See also ==
- List of Sites of Special Scientific Interest in Herefordshire
