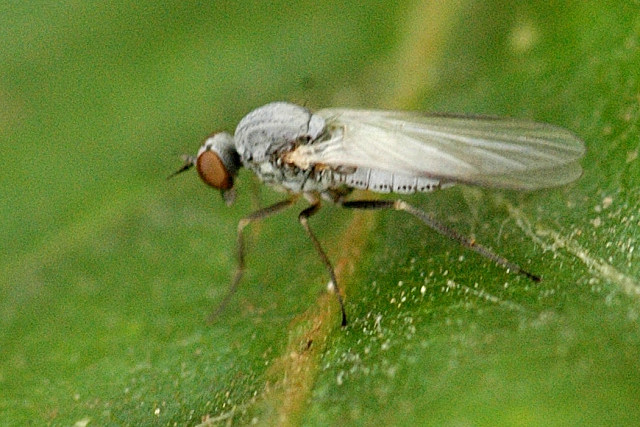

Scientific classification
- Kingdom: Animalia
- Phylum: Arthropoda
- Class: Insecta
- Order: Diptera
- Family: Empididae
- Genus: Hilara
- Species: H. litorea

Binomial name
- Hilara litorea (Fallén, 1816)

Synonyms
- Empis litorea Fallén, 1816

= Hilara litorea =

Species of fly

Hilara litorea is a species of dance fly, in the fly family Empididae.
