= Bushy Hazels & Cwmma Moors =

Protected area in Herefordshire, England

- Site of Special Scientific Interest
- Location within Herefordshire
- Location of Bushy Hazels & Cwmma Moors.
- Area of search: Herefordshire
- Grid reference: SO286511
- Coordinates: 52.153544°N 3.0450241°W
- Area: 73 acres (0.2954 km^{2}; 0.1141 sq mi)
- Notification date: 1983

Bushy Hazels & Cwmma Moors is a Site of Special Scientific Interest (SSSI) near Eardisley in Herefordshire, England. This protected area contains patches of ancient woodland.

== Biology ==
The ancient deciduous woodland is characteristic for the Welsh borders. Two tree species dominate: hazel and ash. Common bluebell has been recorded in Bushy Hazels. Herbaceous plants including dog's mercury, herb paris and sanicle have also been recorded in this protected area.

== Geology ==
The soils at Bushy Hazels & Cwmma Moors SSSI form a calcareous loam derived from the Old Red Sandstone series.

== Land ownership ==
Most of the land within this protected area is owned by the National Trust (they refer to the site as Brilley).
