= Whitchurch, Herefordshire =

Village in Herefordshire, England

Coordinates: 51.85°N 2.65°W

Whitchurch
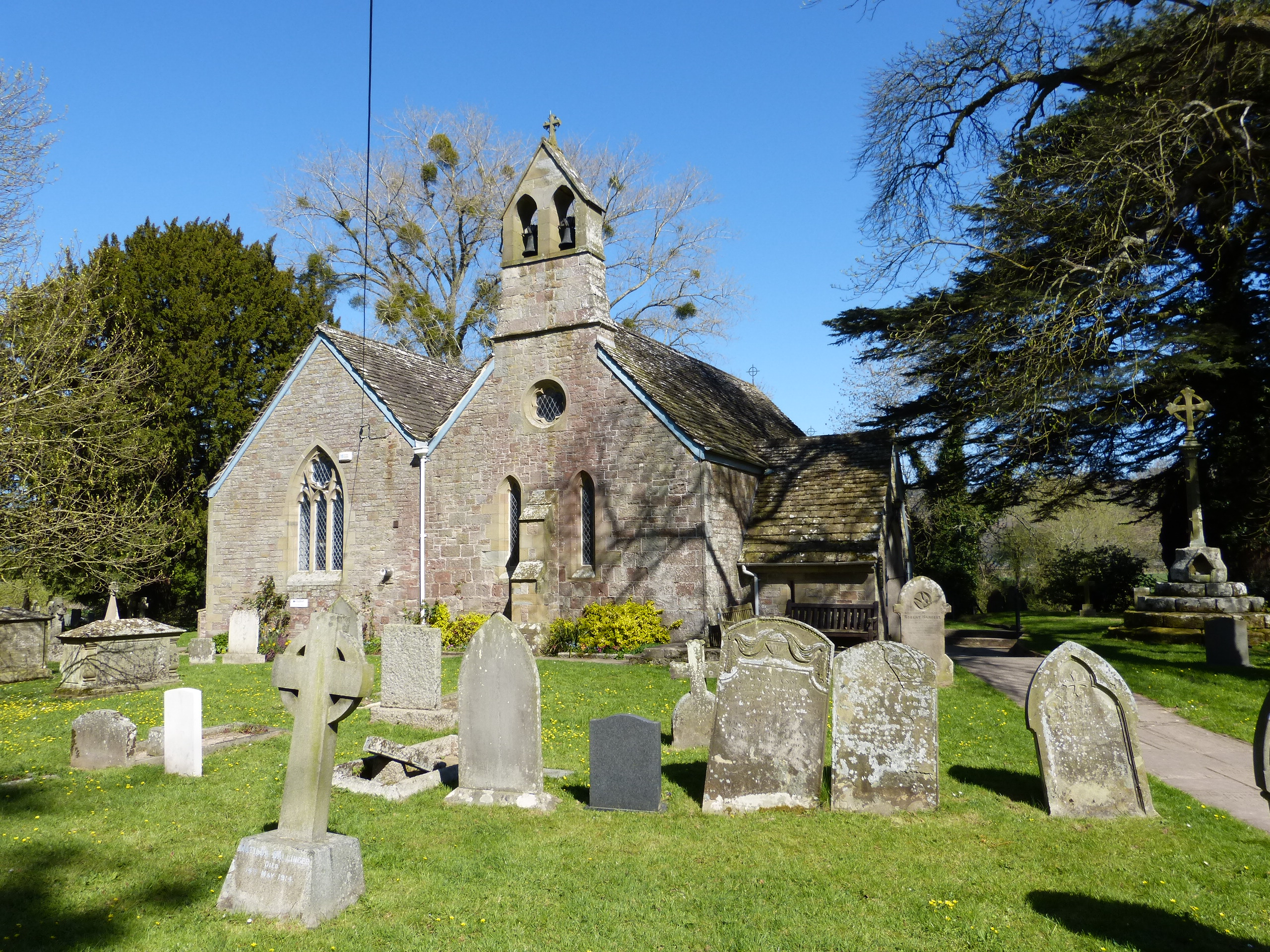
- St Dubricius Church, Whitchurch

- Location within Herefordshire
- Population: 970 (2011)
- OS grid reference: SO550174
- Unitary authority: Herefordshire
- Ceremonial county: Herefordshire
- Region: West Midlands
- Country: England
- Sovereign state: United Kingdom
- Post town: ROSS-ON-WYE
- Postcode district: HR9
- Dialling code: 01600
- Police: West Mercia
- Fire: Hereford and Worcester
- Ambulance: West Midlands
- UK Parliament: Hereford and South Herefordshire

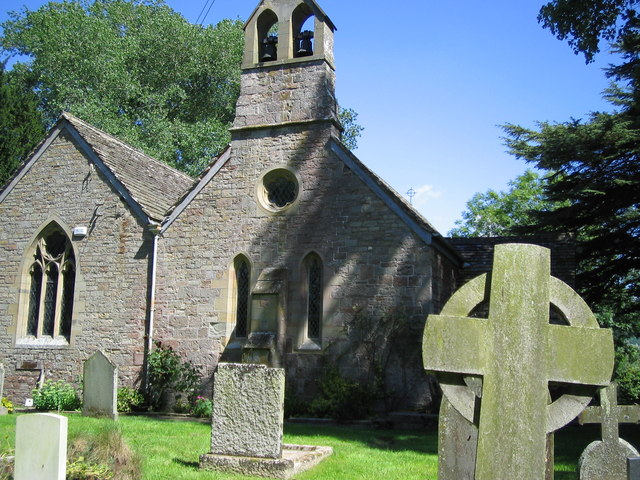
West front of St Dubricius' parish church

Whitchurch is a village in Herefordshire situated on the A40, connecting nearby Ross-on-Wye to Welsh town Monmouth. It is located within the Wye Valley Area of Outstanding Natural Beauty.

Whitchurch parish encompasses the areas of Symonds Yat (West), Lewstone and the Great Doward. These areas are served by the Whitchurch and Ganarew Group Parish Council.

== History ==
King Arthur's Cave, located in the Doward area of Whitchurch parish, is a site of archaeological interest, with the discovery of an Upper Palaeolithic human burial and the remains of mammoth, woolly rhino, giant deer, and cave hyena.

Evidence of a Roman settlement, including a tessallated pavement thought to be the remains of a Roman villa, has been found in a meadow to the side of the road to Monmouth.

Whitchurch is named after the church of Saint Dubricius which was originally white in colour. St Dubricius parish church dates from the 13th century, with Victorian restoration and additions. As the churchyard directly backs onto the river Wye, St Dubricius Church has experienced several instances of flooding, with particularly serious damage occurring in episodes of flooding in 1947 and 2020.

Until the 9th century, when it was taken over by Mercia, Whitchurch was within the Welsh kingdom of Ergyng. After the Norman conquest, the area became known as Archenfield and was governed as part of the Welsh Marches. It became part of Herefordshire, and England, in the 16th century, although the use of Welsh in the area remained strong until the 19th century. The Welsh name for the village, Llandywynnog, means "church of Tywynnog", derived from a personal name Gwynnog.

Within the parish in Symonds Yat (West) is the Old Court (now the Old Court Hotel), which was built in the 16th century and is a Grade II* listed building. The Old Court was the ancestral home of the Gwillim family including Elizabeth Posthuma Gwillim. Thomas Gwillim built the Gwillim family burial enclosure at St Dubricius church in 1744. John Graves Simcoe, first Lieutenant Governor of Upper Canada (1791–1796) and founder of Toronto, named Whitchurch Township in Ontario after the family home of his wife, Elizabeth Gwillim.

The Wye Tour, an excursion route popularised in the late 18th century by William Gilpin, passed through the Whitchurch area along the river, drawing tourism to the scenic area.

== Amenities ==
Whitchurch parish has several inns, pubs, cafes, a local shop, and a nearby caravan and camp site. Across the A40 from Whitchurch village, in Symonds Yat (West), are Wye Valley Visitor Centre, Butterfly Zoo, Jubilee Maze, and leisure park.

Whitchurch & Ganarew Memorial Hall hosts events and activities for the locality.

The village school, Whitchurch Church of England Primary School, has been awarded Unicef UK’s Rights Respecting Schools Award at Silver: Rights Aware and is a Keep Britain Tidy Eco-Schools Ambassador.
