= Fishpool Valley =

Protected area in Herefordshire, England

- Site of Special Scientific Interest
- Location within Herefordshire
- Location of Fishpool Valley.
- Area of search: Herefordshire
- Grid reference: SO450661
- Coordinates: 52.290267°N 2.8077893°W
- Area: 80 acres (0.3237 km^{2}; 0.1250 sq mi)
- Notification date: 1984

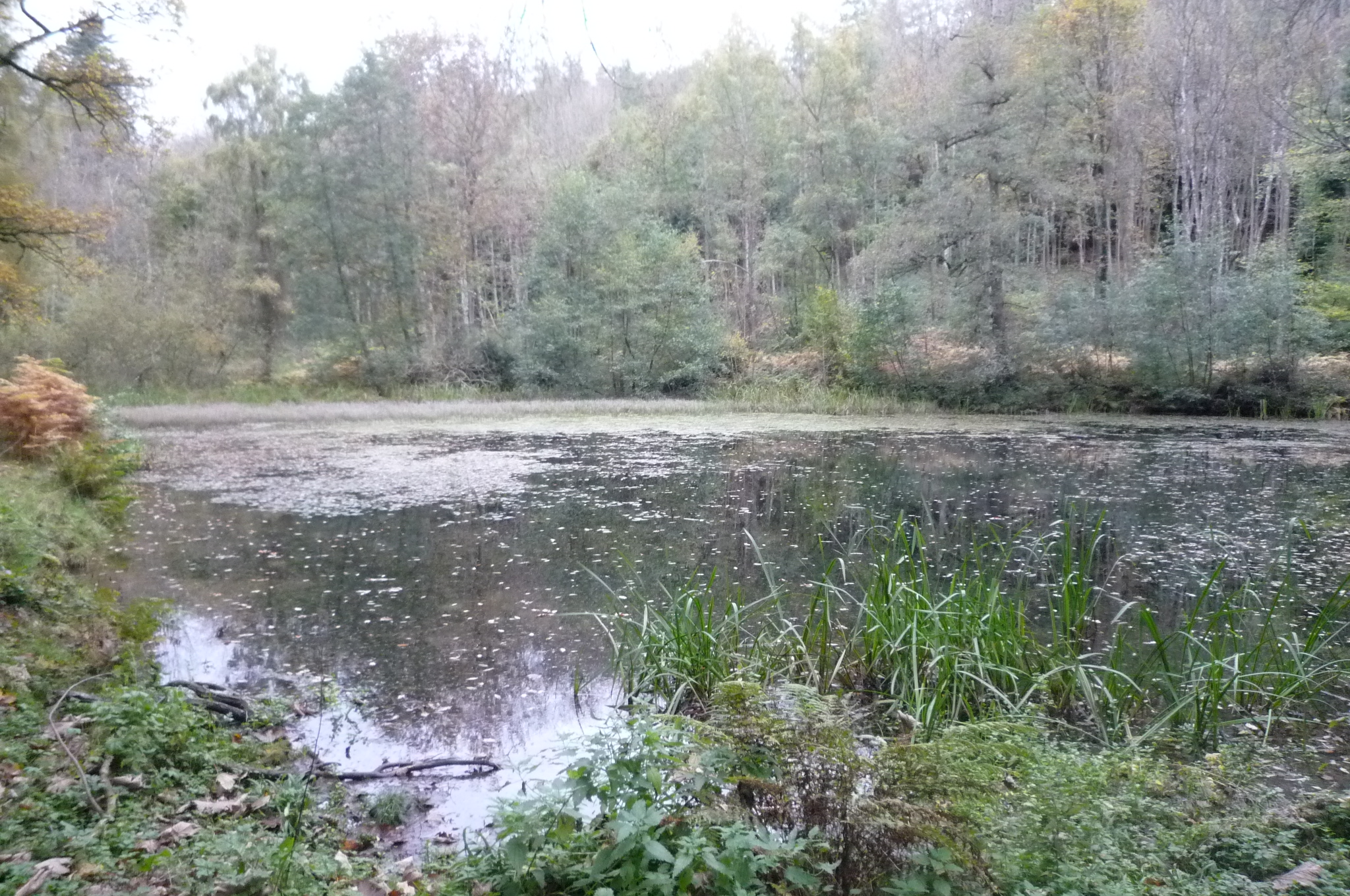
Lake in Fishpool valley

Fishpool Valley is a Site of Special Scientific Interest (SSSI) near Yarpole, Herefordshire, England. This protected area is an area of woodland that is important because of its bird diversity. This protected area is within the Croft Castle estate, owned by the National Trust.

== Biology ==
The tree species that dominate the woodland are ash, pedunculate oak and alder. Notably, hornbeam trees are also present in this protected area.

Bird species include pied flycatcher, treecreeper and greater spotted woodpecker.

Herefordshire Bat Research Group have carried out surveys of bats in this valley.

== Land ownership ==
All of the land designated as Fishpool Valley SSSI is owned by the National Trust.
