= Ledbury Cutting =

Protected area in Herefordshire, England

- Site of Special Scientific Interest
- Location within Herefordshire
- Location of Ledbury Cutting.
- Area of search: Herefordshire
- Grid reference: SO712385
- Coordinates: 52.044141°N 2.4213298°W
- Area: 3.9 acres (0.01578 km^{2}; 0.006094 sq mi)
- Notification date: 1990

Ledbury Cutting is a Site of Special Scientific Interest near Ledbury, Herefordshire, England. The protected area is centred on a railway cutting on the Worcester and Hereford Railway, near to the entrance to the Ledbury Tunnel. The protected area is important because of the fossils of jawed fishes found in the local sediments.

== Geology ==
Strata from the Silurian period were exposed during the digging of the railway cutting and tunnel at Ledbury in 1858–1860. This strata has been referred to as Downtonian. This digging produced many fossils of eurypterids, osteostracans and fossils from the genus Hemicyclaspis and the genus Thyestes. The fossil material is important because of the completeness of the fossils indicated by these fossils having tail sections attached to the head sections called cephalic shields.

Fossil specimens from Ledbury cutting were used to describe two species called Thyestes egertoni and Didymaspsi grindrodi. These specimens are regarded as type specimens.

== Land ownership ==
Part of the land within this protected area is owned by Network Rail.

== Site condition ==
During a survey of the site in 2015, the condition of the site was judged as unfavourable and declining.
