= The Flits =

Protected area in Herefordshire, England

- Site of Special Scientific Interest
- Location within Herefordshire
- Location of The Flits.
- Area of search: Herefordshire
- Grid reference: SO378410
- Coordinates: 52.063866°N 2.9087252°W
- Area: 87.6 acres (0.3545 km^{2}; 0.1369 sq mi)
- Notification date: 1985

The Flits is a Site of Special Scientific Interest (SSSI) near Holywell, six miles west of Hereford in Herefordshire, England. This protected area is also a National Nature Reserve.

== Biology ==
The vegetation within this protected area consists of marshy grassland. Plants include marsh pennywort and globe flower (this site is near the southern limit of the range of globe flower in Britain).

The site is nationally important because of the diversity of insect species. Eight species of soldier flies, at least four species of crane flies and twelve species of snail flies have been recorded here. The beetle Cassida murraea has also been recorded here. Over two hundred butterfly and moth species have been recorded here.

Birds recorded at The Flits SSSI include snipe, curlew and lapwing.

== Geology ==
The soils are a mixture of peat and calcareous organic marls deposited in a glacial channel.

== Land ownership ==
Part of the land designated as The Flits SSSI is owned by the Duchy of Cornwall.
