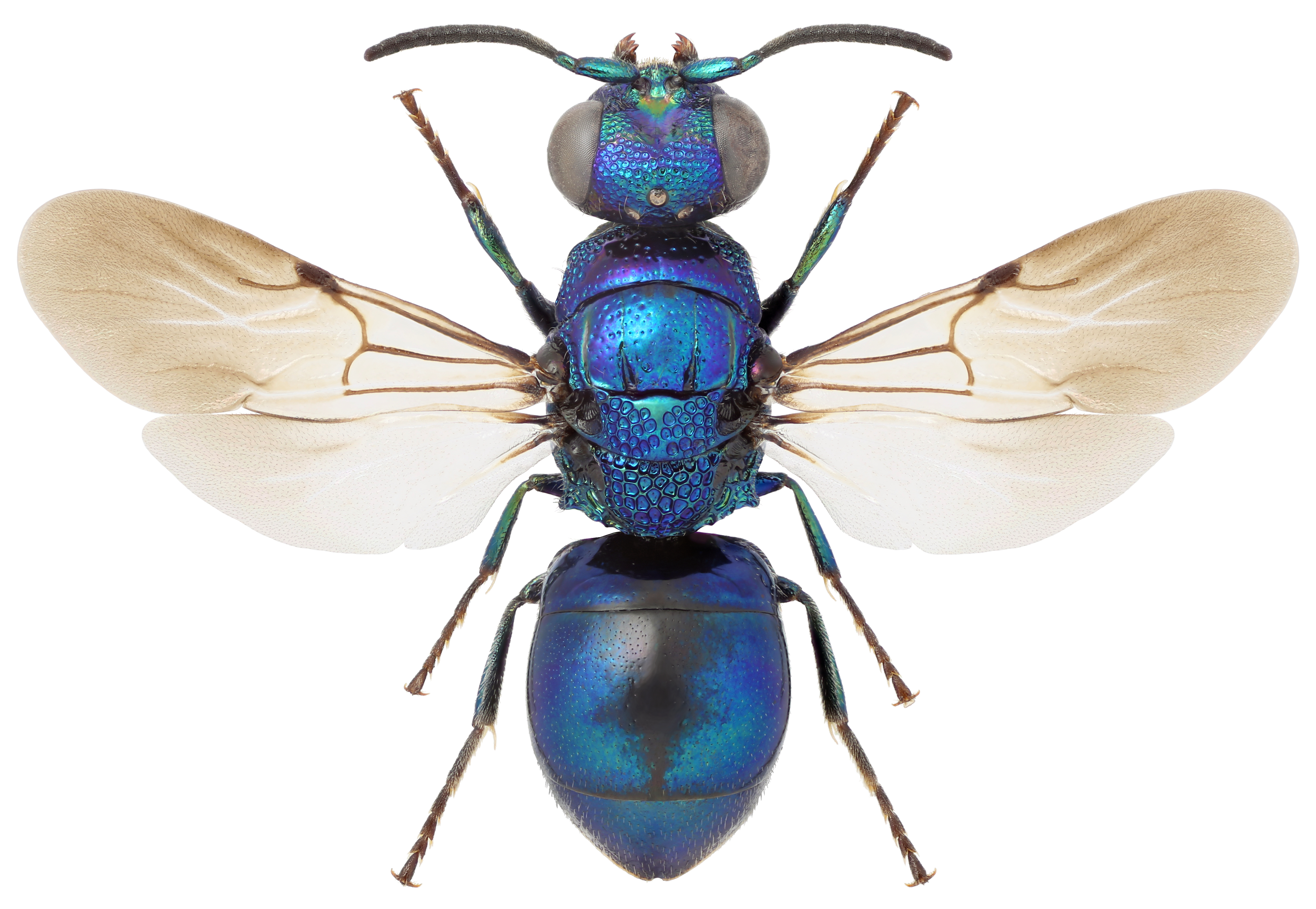

Scientific classification
- Kingdom: Animalia
- Phylum: Arthropoda
- Class: Insecta
- Order: Hymenoptera
- Family: Chrysididae
- Genus: Omalus
- Species: O. puncticollis

Binomial name
- Omalus puncticollis (Mocsary, 1887)

= Omalus puncticollis =

Species of insect

Omalus puncticollis is a species of insect belonging to the family Chrysididae.

Synonym:

- Omalus aeneus puncticollis
