= Hilara media =

Scientific classification
- Kingdom: Animalia
- Phylum: Arthropoda
- Class: Insecta
- Order: Diptera
- Family: Empididae
- Genus: Hilara
- Species: H. media

Binomial name
- Hilara media Collin, 1927

Species of fly

Hilara media is a species of flies belonging to the family Empididae.

It is native to Great Britain.
