= Wyastone Leys =

Grade II-listed country house in England

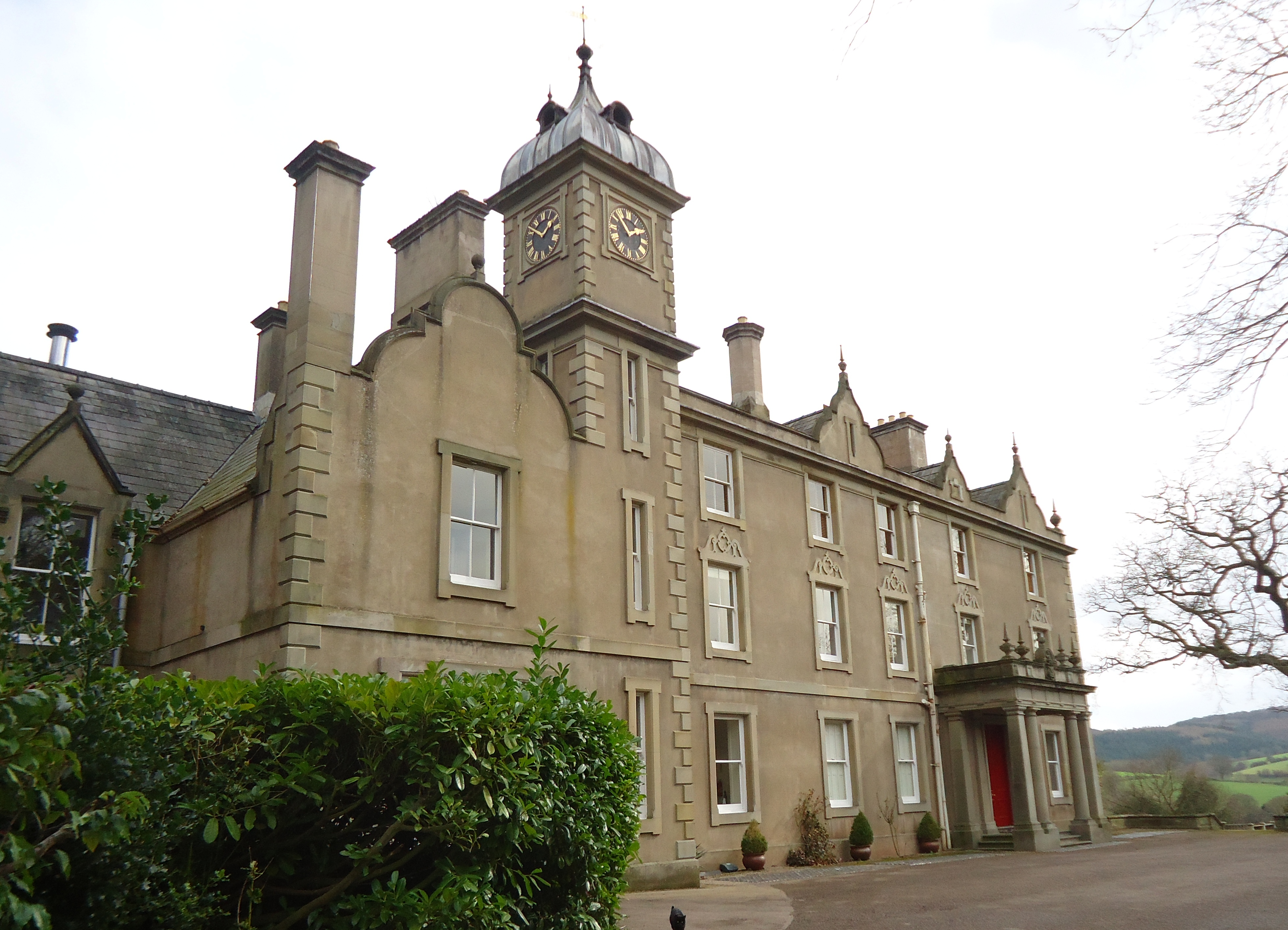
- Front elevation of the house
- Interactive map of the Wyastone Leys area

General information
- Status: Grade II Listed Building (8 July 1995)
- Coordinates: 51.8382°N 2.6823°W
- Opened: 1795
- Renovated: 1861

Design and construction
- Main contractor: William Burn

Wyastone Leys is a country house estate and Grade II listed building situated near Ganarew, in the southwestern corner of The Doward, in Herefordshire, England. The house and estate has also been known as The Leys or Lays House. It is located 2 miles (3.2 km) from Monmouth and 8 miles (13 km) from Ross-on-Wye. The house is in close proximity to the River Wye and less than 50 metres (160 ft) from the Welsh border.

The house and its surrounding buildings are now occupied by Nimbus Records, who were the first producers of compact discs in the UK. In the woodland of Little Doward Hill above the house, the Forestry Commission planted, in 1959, a pattern of trees with contrasting foliage in the shape of the letters ER, to mark the Coronation of Queen Elizabeth II.

== The house and grounds ==
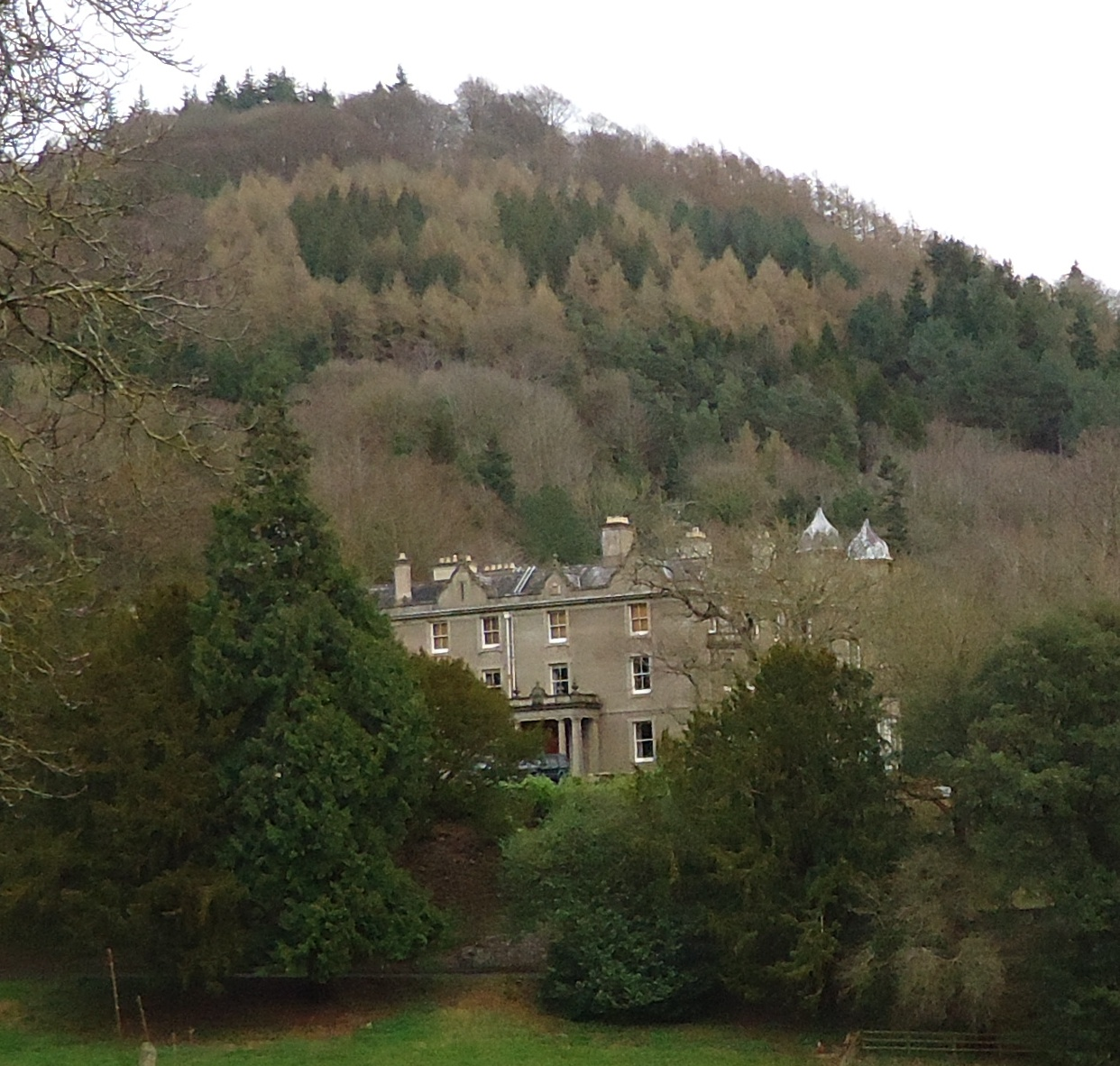
View of the house, showing the Forestry Commission planting on Little Doward Hill in the shape of the letters ER

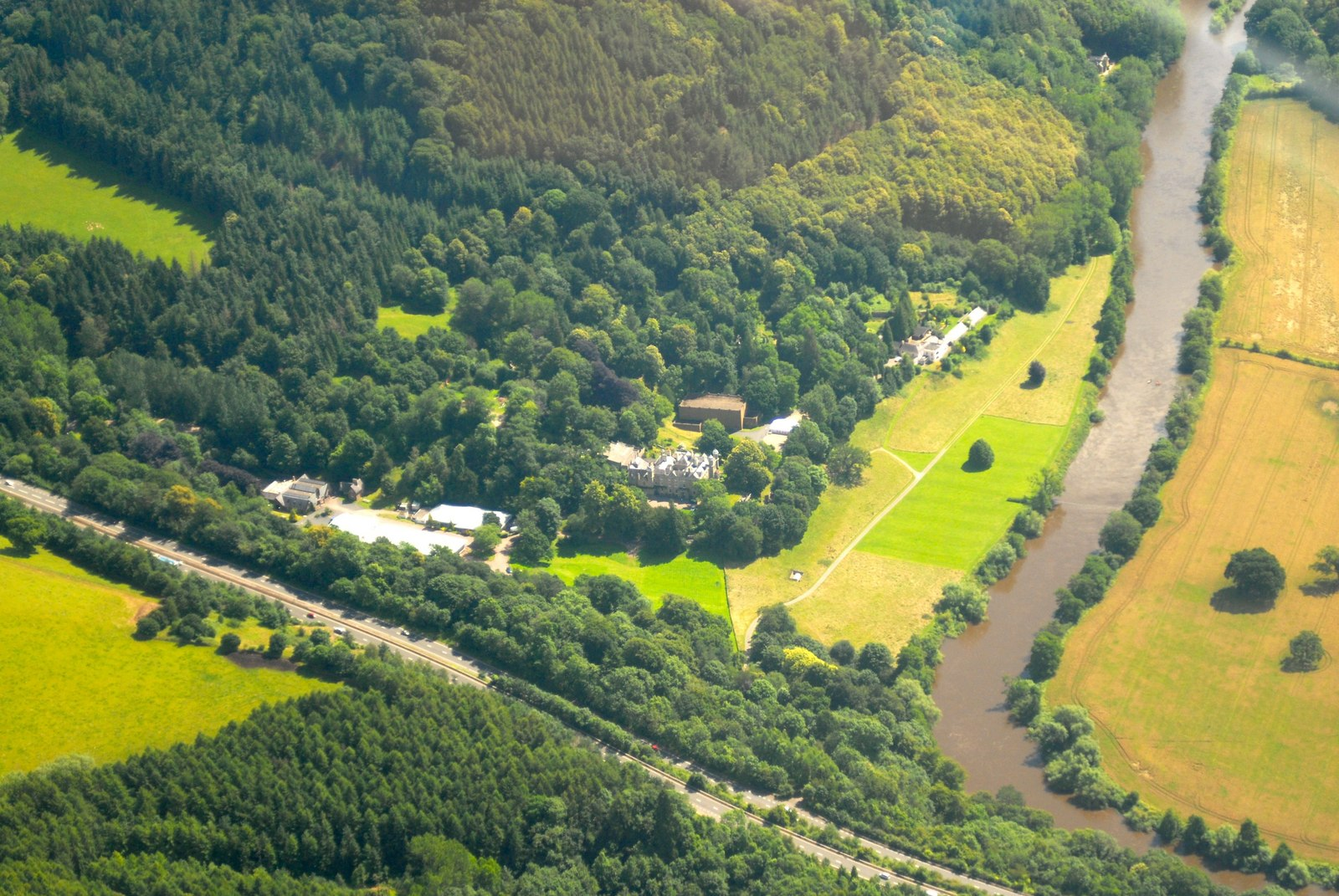
Aerial view, also showing the River Wye and the A40 dual carriageway

The original house, The Leys, was built in 1795 by S. O. Attley of London.

It was purchased around 1820 by Richard Blakemore. The turnpiking of the road between Monmouth and Ross-on-Wye in 1821, creating a new road higher up the hillside than the old road, allowed Blakemore to extend the estate. Blakemore also bought the Hadnock estate on the other side of the River Wye, demolished Hadnock House, and used the materials to rebuild and extend the Leys, between 1821 and 1838. He also demolished cottages on the estate, to improve the views; converted the old Ross road into a private driveway; planted woodland to screen the house from the new road; and added walls, railings and an entrance lodge. A 320 acres (130 ha) deer park was created on Little Doward Hill, stocked with deer brought in from Llantrithyd in Glamorgan, and an observatory was built on the hilltop.

The house was rebuilt in 1861 for John Bannerman of Manchester, by William Burn. The 1861 sale catalogue mentions extensive pleasure grounds, gardens, conservatories, vineries and an additional house for the gardener. Bannerman added new lodges, stables, kennels, and a belvedere, and renamed the estate Wyastone Leys. The deer park was abandoned, and the observatory removed, in the early 20th century.

The house now is a three-storey building with a 2-storey service wing. A small shaped gable above the entrance bay bears the Bannerman family coat of arms. Features include a block tower and turrets, slate roofs and a four-storey clock tower with a clock face on three sides. The interior has been largely altered to accommodate business and domestic uses; a long drawing room at rear of the ground floor retains some fine restored stucco ceiling ornament.

Despite being in Herefordshire, the house and grounds often hosted Monmouthshire hunt meetings, as parts of the original estate are in Monmouthshire.

In 1953, the Forestry Commission decided to commemorate the Coronation of Elizabeth II by planting trees with contrasting foliage in the shape of a crown and the letters ER (for Elizabeth Regina) in the woodland above the house. The pattern can still be seen.

== Ownership ==
The original estate was built by S. O. Attley, from London, on virgin ground in 1795. The estate was bought in 1820 by Richard Blakemore, a local industrialist. At that time, the house and grounds were known as The Leys. Blakemore was defeated when he stood for Parliament in 1826 for the Hereford constituency. He later became High Sheriff of Herefordshire in 1830, and Member of Parliament for Wells. He was living in the house and listed as a Member of Parliament in the 1851 census.

John Murray Bannerman (died 24 February 1870), acquired and rebuilt the house in 1861. The Bannermans made their money from the cotton trade, the family firm being Henry Bannerman and Sons Limited. John was the son of Henry Bannerman (died 1823), who was a successful farmer in Perthshire who moved into the thriving cotton trade in Manchester in about 1808. The business traded in cotton, calicoes, muslins and plain fabrics. The firm owned several large mills in the Manchester area. The mills were acquired by Courtaulds in 1964 and all production ceased in 1967. Following the death of John Bannerman, James Murray Bannerman (1846–1914), John's son, became the head of the household. He had a B.A. degree from Christ Church, Oxford, and had been a Captain in the Monmouth Engineer Militia. A Justice of the Peace, he became a barrister on 26 January 1874. In 1879 he became the High Sheriff of Monmouthshire. He married Louise Mary Wheeley in 1880. In 1894 the house came up for sale. An impressive monument to the Bannerman family may be seen in the graveyard of the church at Ganarew.

Sir Alfred and Lady Hickman were the next occupants of the house, living there from at least 1940 until 1946 when they moved to Charrington Court, Winchcombe, Gloucestershire. The next owner of the estate was Brigadier Robert Peel Waller DSO (1941), MC (1918) (1895 – 1978). He was Artillery Commander 1941 - 1945 in Persia and the Middle East during World War Two. He married Olave Harriet Fock, daughter of Baron de Robeck, in 1921 and was living in the house in 1946 on his silver wedding anniversary. He became High Sheriff of Herefordshire in 1958. Robert Waller was living at the house when he remarried in 1970, after Olave's death in 1966. In 1973 the site came up for sale once again, advertised as also having three cottages, wooded gardens and water meadows.

=== Nimbus Records ===
Nimbus Records took over the buildings and estate in 1975, when it was described as "very run down". Their initial aim was to develop a pressing of high-quality vinyl LPs. The record company specialised in very high quality sound recording, and Nimbus created the first independent CD disc manufacturing plant in the UK. This was based on the MCA Discovision / Philips patents for Laser Disc Recorder which Philips licensed to other CD factories. The company was also involved in the development of their own form of surround sound and won Queens Awards for both Technology and Export.

The company took an interest in the house, reverting the flats into which it had been divided, into a single dwelling and rehanging some of the original tapestries. In 1985 the stable block of the house was converted into offices. Further development of the site took place in 1992 when a 550-seat concert hall was built. This has been used as a venue for concerts, recordings, television productions and live broadcasts. Part of the estate is now run as a small business park with offices, light industrial units and storage facilities.

In 2004, after the new holding company Wyastone Estate was established, the North Wing of the house was converted into offices for Wyastone Estate, Nimbus Records, The Nimbus Foundation and Nimbus Disc and Print. A short run CD manufacturing plant was also installed and is where all Wyastone Estate CDs are produced including Nimbus Records, Lyrita, Saydisc, Cameo Classics, Red Priest, Atoll Records, Integra, The Hallé and Retrospective Records.

The house and grounds were used as a production location for the BBC series Torchwood in 2007 and in 2015 for the Guy Ritchie epic adventure film King Arthur: Legend of the Sword.
