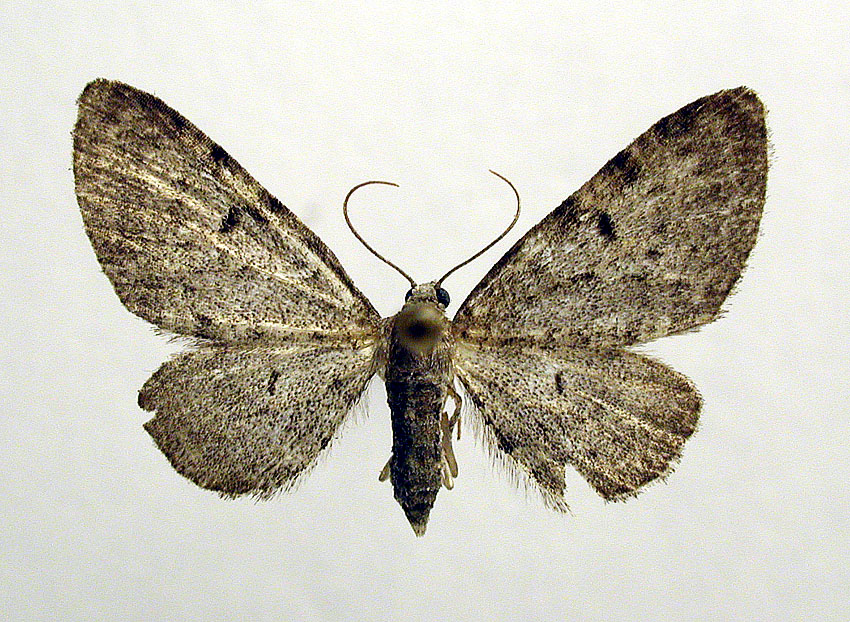

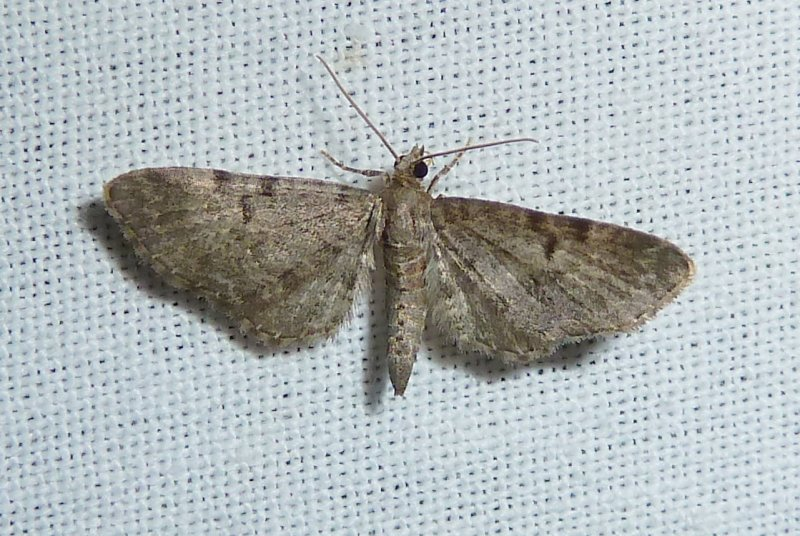

Scientific classification
- Kingdom: Animalia
- Phylum: Arthropoda
- Class: Insecta
- Order: Lepidoptera
- Family: Geometridae
- Genus: Eupithecia
- Species: E. trisignaria

Binomial name
- Eupithecia trisignaria Herrich-Schäffer, 1848

= Eupithecia trisignaria =

Species of moth

Eupithecia trisignaria, the triple-spotted pug, is a moth of the family Geometridae. It is found from across the Palearctic realm from Europe to Siberia.

The wingspan is about 20 mm. The ground colour of the forewings is fuscous (brownish-grey, tawny). The darker striae (crosslines) are indistinct and obtusely angulated. The edges of a vague geniculate median band are marked faintly darker, especially as two dark costal spots which form the corners of an equilateral triangle with the discal spot. The forewing fringes are chequered to not chequered. The hindwings are fuscous with only very faint striae and fasciae; even less conspicuously patterned than the forewings but with a clear dark fuscous, shortly linear discal mark. The larva is green with pale lateral stripes and two darker green dorsal stripes.

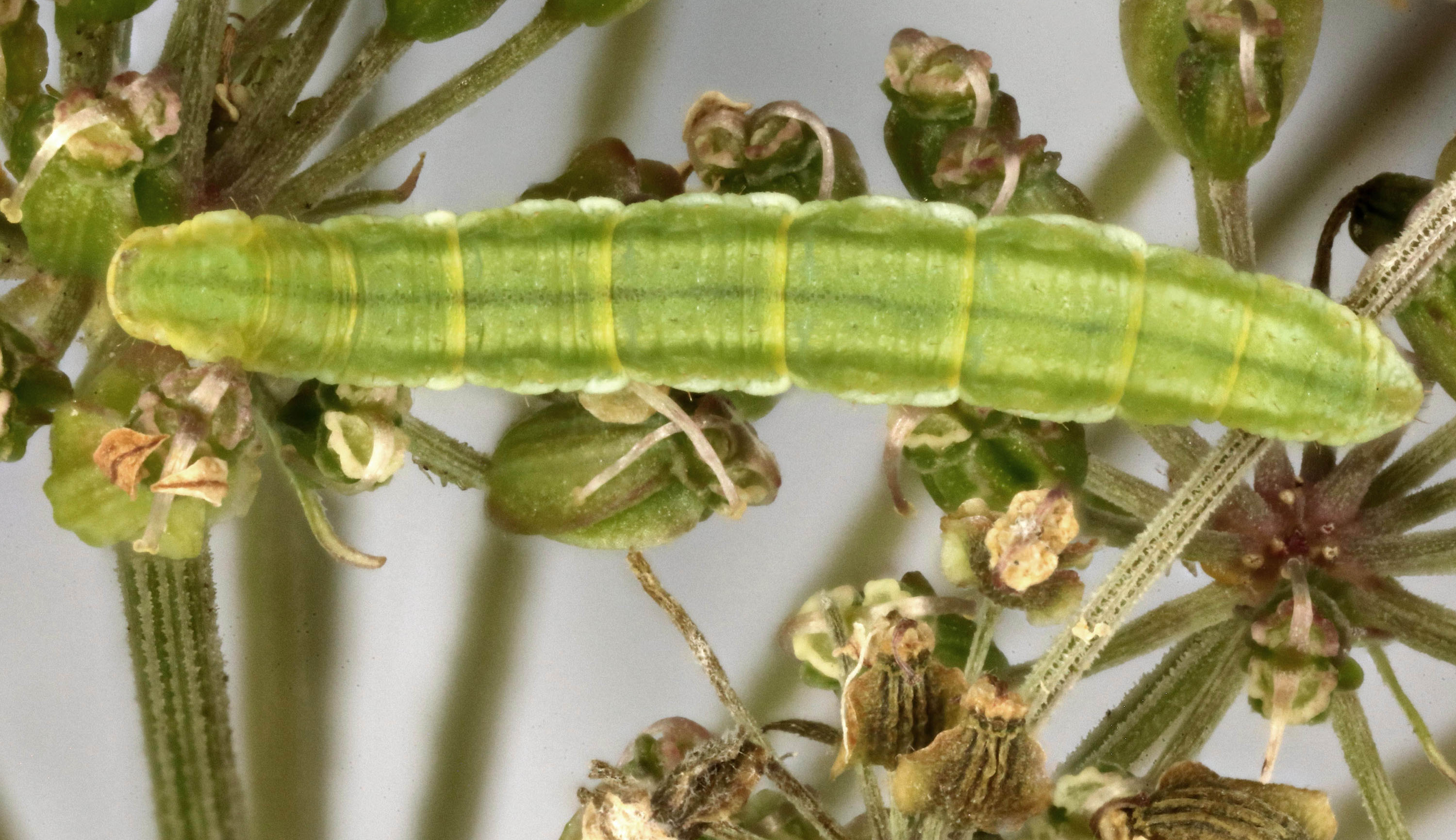
Larva Newborough Forest, North Wales, Sept 2016

There is one generation per year with adults on wing from June to August.

The larvae feed on various Apiaceae species, including Angelica and Heracleum species. Larvae can be found from August to October. It overwinters as a pupa.
