= Littlemarsh Common =

Protected area in Herefordshire, England

Coordinates: 52.035752°N 2.8192283°W

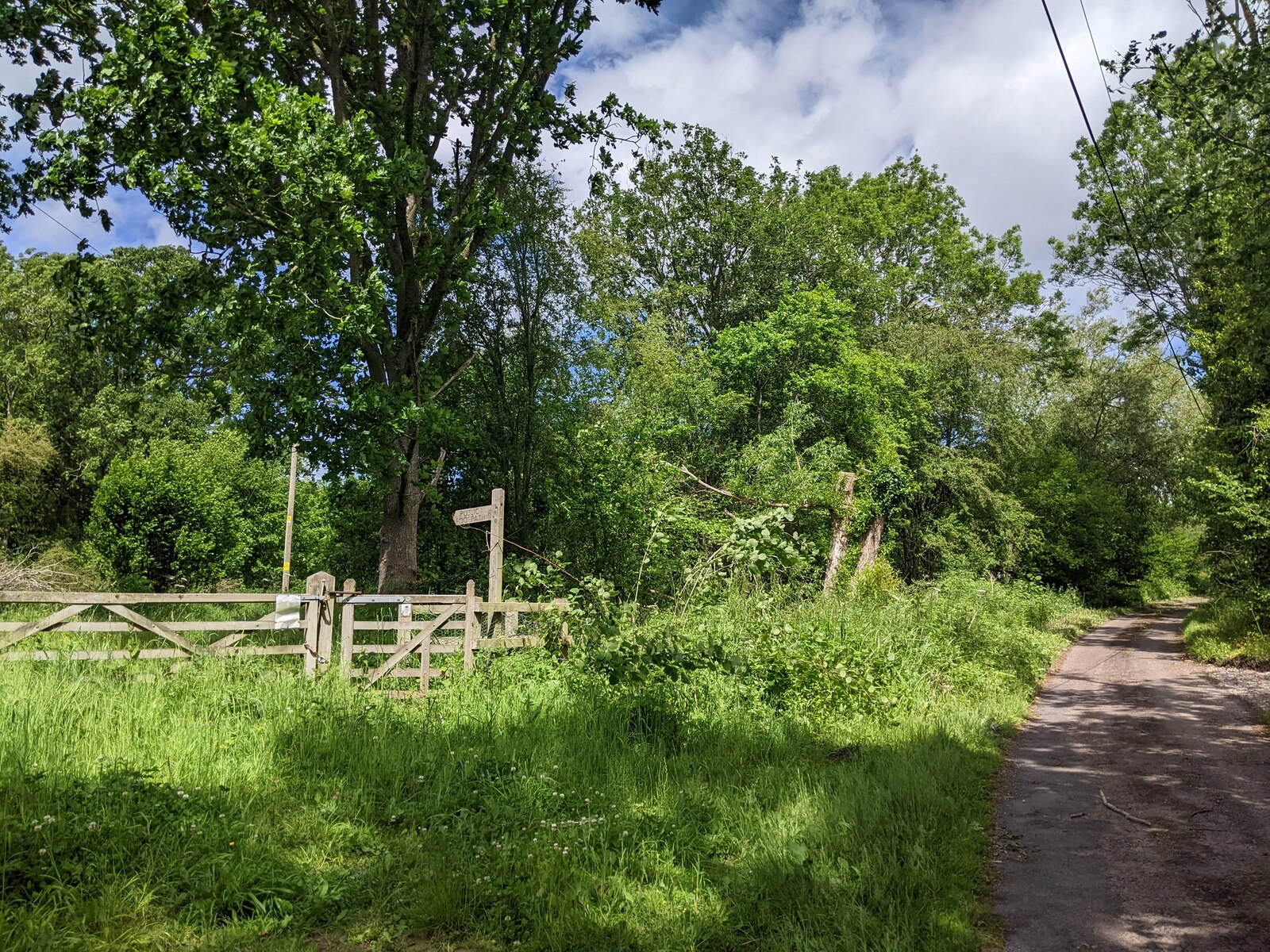
Littlemarsh Common

Littlemarsh Common is a Site of Special Scientific Interest (SSSI) in Herefordshire, England. It is located 900m west of the village of Clehonger. This is an area of grassland protected because of its high diversity of plant species.

== Biology ==
Plant species in this grassland include spiny rest-harrow, common spotted orchid, ragged robin, lady’s mantle and devil’s-bit scabious. In wet areas plant species include yellow flag, meadow sweet and water figwort.

Bird species recorded in Littlemarsh Common include the nightingale.

== Land management ==
Eaton Bishop Parish Council have a lease with the Church Commissioners to maintain Littlemarsh Common SSSI. Eaton Bishop Parish Council are taking a close interest in the management of this protected area.
