= Herefordshire Wildlife Trust =

Wildlife trust covering the county of Herefordshire, England

The Herefordshire Wildlife Trust (formally Herefordshire Nature Trust) is a wildlife trust covering the county of Herefordshire, England.
