= Hypenella bhura =

Scientific classification
- Kingdom: Animalia
- Phylum: Arthropoda
- Clade: Pancrustacea
- Class: Insecta
- Order: Diptera
- Superfamily: Empidoidea
- Family: Empididae
- Subfamily: Clinocerinae
- Genus: Hypenella
- Species: H. bhura

Binomial name
- Hypenella bhura Smith, 1965

Species of fly

Hypenella bhura is a species of dance flies, in the fly family Empididae.

== Description ==
This species is 2.25 mm (0.089 in) in length. The head is similar to other species of this genus, but the occiput is black. The facial hairs are stronger and it resembles H. empodiata.

The thorax is brown with a pale mid-stripe. The thorax is darker on the prescutellar depression without any pale areas that is under 2 posterior dorsocentrals, even though it's paler on the humeri and the notopleurae. The thorax has lots of dense microscopic pile. The chaetotaxy is similar to H. spumarius. The pleurae is greyish and the scutellum is dark brown with 2 long apical bristles.

The abdomen is olivaceous brown but grayish when it's on a disk. The venter is more greyish and the hypopygium is brownish. The coxae and the femora are yellow. The remaining parts are black. It lacks any bristles besides a "comb" of 5 short dorsal bristles on the distal quarter of the hind tibiae.

The wings are distinctly brown tinged without stigma. The halteres are yellowish. The ventation is similar to H. spumarius.

== Etymology ==
The specific name "bhura", which translates to "brown" in Hindi likely refers to the majority of the body parts of H. bhura being brownish.

== Distribution ==
The species is found in Nepal, in the Taplejung municipality, in the village of Dovan. The (male) holotype was found 1.096 m on rocks in the Maewa river. Its occurrence is uncommon in the river and the holotype was collected in January.
