= Phaeobalia trinotata =

Scientific classification
- Kingdom: Animalia
- Phylum: Arthropoda
- Class: Insecta
- Order: Diptera
- Superfamily: Empidoidea
- Family: Empididae
- Subfamily: Clinocerinae
- Genus: Phaeobalia
- Species: P. trinotata

Binomial name
- Phaeobalia trinotata (Mik, 1869)

Synonyms
- Clinocera trinotata Mik, 1869

Species of fly

Phaeobalia trinotata is a species of dance flies, in the fly family Empididae.
