= Asymphyloptera =

Scientific classification
- Kingdom: Animalia
- Phylum: Arthropoda
- Clade: Pancrustacea
- Class: Insecta
- Order: Diptera
- Family: Empididae
- Subfamily: Clinocerinae
- Genus: Asymphyloptera; Collin, 1933

Type species
- Asymphyloptera discrepans Collin, 1933

Genus of flies

Asymphyloptera is a genus of Empidid fly that belongs to the subfamily Clinocerinae. The can be found distributed across the New World and the Australasian region.

== Distribution ==
Members of this genus can be found distributed across the New World and in the Australasian region. In the New World, they can be found in Chile, Peru, Venezuela, Colombia, Mexico, Costa Rica, Dominica and the United States. In the Australasian region, they can be found in Australia, New Zealand, New Caledonia and Norfolk Island.

== Taxonomy ==
=== Taxonomic history ===
The taxonomic history of Asymphyloptera begins with this genus being created in 1933 by James Edward Collin, a English entomologist that specializes in Dipteran taxonomy. The type species for this genus is Asymphyloptera discrepans. This genus along with Afroclinocera and Proagomyia were initially thought to be a sister group to other Clinocerinae genera. However a study by (Vojvoda Zeljko et al, 2024) has raised doubts on the placement of Asymphyloptera within Clinocerinae.

Records of Asymphyloptera were originally restricted to type specimens. This was until (Sinclair, 1995) where several specimens of undescribed species were collected in Arizona, Costa Rica and Venezuela. Then seven new species from the New World, mostly from South America, was described by (Sinclair, 2015), they were; A. cajanuma (Ecuador), A. chilensis (Chile), A. chiricahua (Arizona), A. dominica (Dominica), A. havasu (Arizona), A. lutea (Costa Rica) and A. mexicana (Mexico). Then in 2023, two members of this genus were discovered; A. miraflorensis and A. tama.

=== Species ===
There are currently 12 described species discovered to belong to this genus. They are listed below:

- Asymphyloptera andinoamazonica Ramos-Pastrana & Córdoba-Suarez, 2026
- Asymphyloptera discrepans Collin, 1933
- Asymphyloptera cajanuma Sinclair, 2015
- Asymphyloptera chilensis Sinclair, 2015
- Asymphyloptera chiricahua Sinclair, 2015
- Asymphyloptera dominica Sinclair, 2015
- Asymphyloptera havasu Sinclair, 2015
- Asymphyloptera lutea Sinclair, 2015
- Asymphyloptera mexicana Sinclair, 2015
- Asymphyloptera miraflorensis Yardany Ramos-Pastrana et al. 2023
- Asymphyloptera tama Yardany Ramos-Pastrana et al. 2023
- Asymphyloptera quadriseta Smith, 1961
