= Phaeobalia brevitibia =

Scientific classification
- Kingdom: Animalia
- Phylum: Arthropoda
- Class: Insecta
- Order: Diptera
- Superfamily: Empidoidea
- Family: Empididae
- Subfamily: Clinocerinae
- Genus: Phaeobalia
- Species: P. brevitibia

Binomial name
- Phaeobalia brevitibia (Melander, 1928)

Synonyms
- Clinocera brevitibia Melander, 1928

Species of fly

Phaeobalia brevitibia is a species of dance flies, in the fly family Empididae.
