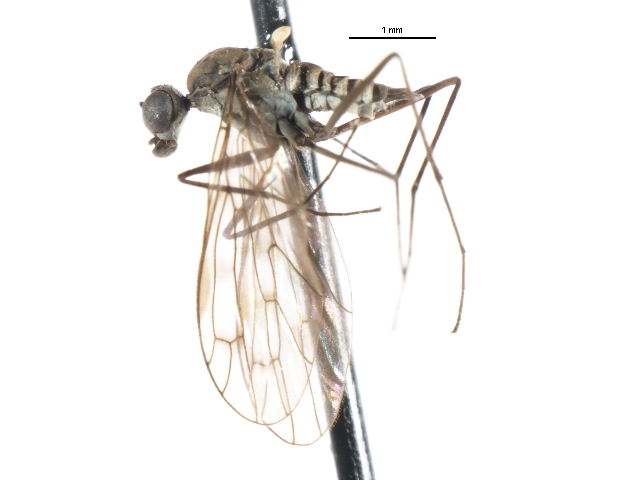

Scientific classification
- Kingdom: Animalia
- Phylum: Arthropoda
- Class: Insecta
- Order: Diptera
- Superfamily: Empidoidea
- Family: Empididae
- Subfamily: Clinocerinae
- Genus: Phaeobalia
- Species: P. lecta

Binomial name
- Phaeobalia lecta (Melander, 1902)

Synonyms
- Clinocera lecta Melander, 1902

= Phaeobalia lecta =

Species of fly

Phaeobalia lecta is a species of dance flies, in the fly family Empididae.
