= Phaeobalia maculata =

Scientific classification
- Kingdom: Animalia
- Phylum: Arthropoda
- Class: Insecta
- Order: Diptera
- Superfamily: Empidoidea
- Family: Empididae
- Subfamily: Clinocerinae
- Genus: Phaeobalia
- Species: P. maculata

Binomial name
- Phaeobalia maculata (Vaillant, 1964)

Synonyms
- Clinocera maculata Vaillant, 1968

Species of fly

Phaeobalia maculata is a species of dance flies, in the fly family Empididae.
