= Bergenstammia =

Scientific classification
- Kingdom: Animalia
- Phylum: Arthropoda
- Clade: Pancrustacea
- Class: Insecta
- Order: Diptera
- Family: Empididae
- Subfamily: Clinocerinae
- Genus: Bergenstammia; Mik, 1881

Type species
- Clinocera nudipes Loew, 1858

Genus of flies

Bergenstammia is a genus of flies in the family Empididae. It is sometime treated as a sub-genus of Clinocera

== Species ==
- B. albanica Wagner, 1993
- B. aurinae Pusch & Wagner, 1993
- B. carniolica Horvat, 1994
- B. frigida (Vaillant, 1964)
- B. multiseta Strobl, 1893
- B. nudimana (Vaillant, 1973)
- B. nudipes (Loew, 1858)
- B. pulla Vaillant & Wagner, 1989
- B. pyrenaica Vaillant & Vincon, 1987
- B. slovaca Wagner, 1984
- B. thomasi Vaillant & Vincon, 1998
