= Phaeobalia vaillanti =

Scientific classification
- Kingdom: Animalia
- Phylum: Arthropoda
- Class: Insecta
- Order: Diptera
- Superfamily: Empidoidea
- Family: Empididae
- Subfamily: Clinocerinae
- Genus: Phaeobalia
- Species: P. vaillanti

Binomial name
- Phaeobalia vaillanti (Wagner, 1982)

Synonyms
- Clinocera vaillanti Wagner, 1982

Species of fly

Phaeobalia vaillanti is a species of dance flies, in the fly family Empididae.
