= Wiedemannia (fly) =

Scientific classification
- Kingdom: Animalia
- Phylum: Arthropoda
- Clade: Pancrustacea
- Class: Insecta
- Order: Diptera
- Family: Empididae
- Subfamily: Clinocerinae
- Genus: Wiedemannia; Zetterstedt, 1838

Type species
- Wiedemannia borealis Zetterstedt, 1838

Genus of flies

Wiedemannia is a genus of flies in the family Empididae.

== Species ==
- W. aequilobata Mandaron, 1964
- W. aerea Vaillant, 1967
- W. agilis Vaillant, 1950
- W. alpina (Engel, 1918)
- W. alticola Vaillant, 1950
- W. andreevi Joost, 1982
- W. angelieri Vaillant, 1967
- W. apicalis Sinclair, 1998
- W. aquilex (Loew, 1869)
- W. ariadne Wagner, 1981
- W. ariolae Pusch, 1996
- W. armata (Engel, 1918)
- W. arvernensis Vaillant, 1964
- W. astigmatica (Stackelberg, 1937)
- W. austriaca Vaillant, 1964
- W. azurea (Vaillant, 1951)
- W. balkanica Wagner, 1981
- W. beckeri (Mik, 1889)
- W. berthelemyi Vaillant & Vincon, 1987
- W. bicolorata Vaillant, 1960
- W. bicuspidata (Engel, 1918)
- W. bifida Vaillant, 1964
- W. bilobata Oldenberg, 1910
- W. bistigma (Curtis, 1834)
- W. bohemani (Zetterstedt, 1838)
- W. braueri (Mik, 1880)
- W. bravonae Pusch, 1996
- W. brevilamelata Wagner, 1985
- W. carpathia Vaillant, 1967
- W. caucasica Joost, 1981
- W. chvalai Joost, 1981
- W. chvali Joost, 1981
- W. comata Melander, 1928
- W. corsicana Vaillant, 1964
- W. crinita Engel, 1918
- W. czernyi (Bezzi, 1905)
- W. debilis Collin, 1961
- W. digitata Vaillant & Vincon, 1987
- W. digna Sinclair, 2006
- W. dinarica Engel, 1940
- W. dyonysica Wagner, 1990
- W. edendalensis Smith, 1969
- W. erminea (Mik, 1887)
- W. escheri (Zetterstedt, 1838)
- W. falcifera Vaillant, 1967
- W. foliacea Vaillant, 1960
- W. glaciola Wagner, 1985
- W. gorongoza Smith, 1969
- W. gracilis Vaillant, 1950
- W. graeca Vaillant & Wagner, 1990
- W. gubernans Melander, 1928
- W. hastata (Mik, 1880)
- W. hirtiloba (Speiser, 1924)
- W. hughesi Smith, 1969
- W. hygrobia (Loew, 1858)
- W. impudica (Mik, 1880)
- W. insularis Collin, 1927
- W. iphigeniae Ivković & Sinclair, 2017
- W. jadzewskii Niesiolowski, 1987
- W. jakubi Krysiak, 2005
- W. jugorum (Strobl, 1893).
- W. juvenilis Zetterstedt, 1842
- W. kacanskae Horvat, 1993
- W. kallistes Pusch, 1996
- W. kenyae Sinclair, 1999
- W. klausnitzeri Joost, 1981
- W. koeppeni Joost, 1980
- W. kroatica Wagner, 1981
- W. lagunae (Becker, 1908)
- W. lamellata (Loew, 1869)
- W. languedocica Vaillant, 1964
- W. lepida (Melander, 1902)
- W. litardierei Vaillant, 1956
- W. ljerkae Ivković & Sinclair, 2017
- W. longicornis (Mik, 1887)
- W. lota Walker, 1851
- W. martini Pusch, 1996
- W. mauersbergeri Joost, 1984
- W. maxima Wagner, 1984
- W. medjahedica Vaillant & Gagneur, 1998
- W. mgounica Vaillant, 1956
- W. microstigma (Bezzi, 1904)
- W. mikiana (Bezzi, 1899)
- W. mirousei Vaillant, 1956
- W. nebulosa Ivković & Sinclair, 2017
- W. nevadensis Wagner, 1990
- W. oldenbergi (Engel, 1918)
- W. oredonensis Vaillant, 1967
- W. ornata (Engel, 1918)
- W. oxystoma (Bezzi, 1905)
- W. phantasma (Mik, 1880)
- W. pieninensis Krysiak & Niesiolowski, 2004
- W. plavensis Raffone, 2011
- W. pohoriana Horvat, 1995
- W. pseudoberthelemyi Ivković & Sinclair, 2017
- W. pseudovaillanti Joost, 1981
- W. pusilla (Loew, 1858)
- W. pyrenaica Vaillant, 1967
- W. quercifolia (Engel, 1918)
- W. queyarasiana Vaillant, 1956
- W. reducta Jones, 1940
- W. rhynchops (Nowicki, 1868)
- W. rivulorum Wagner, 1990
- W. rudebecki Smith, 1967
- W. rufipes (Oldenberg, 1915)
- W. similis Vaillant, 1960
- W. simplex (Loew, 1862)
- W. sorex (Engel, 1918)
- W. stylifera Mik, 1889
- W. submarina Jones, 1940
- W. syriaca Wagner, 1982
- W. thienemanni Wagner, 1982
- W. thomasi Vaillant, 1968
- W. tiburica Wagner & Cobo, 2001
- W. tricuspidata (Bezzi, 1905)
- W. uncinata Sinclair, 1997
- W. undulata Sinclair, 1997
- W. vaillanti Joost, 1981
- W. veletica Vaillant & Chvála, 1973
- W. vexillum Sinclair, 1997
- W. wachtli (Mik, 1880)
- W. zetterstedti (Fallén, 1826)
- W. zwicki Wagner, 1982
