= Dolichocephala ocellata =

Scientific classification
- Kingdom: Animalia
- Phylum: Arthropoda
- Class: Insecta
- Order: Diptera
- Infraorder: Asilomorpha
- Superfamily: Empidoidea
- Family: Empididae
- Subfamily: Clinocerinae
- Genus: Dolichocephala
- Species: D. ocellata

Binomial name
- Dolichocephala ocellata (Costa, 1854)

Synonyms
- Dolichocephala algira Vaillant, 1956

Species of fly

Dolichocephala ocellata is a species of dance flies, in the fly family Empididae.
