= Phaeobalia elongata =

Scientific classification
- Kingdom: Animalia
- Phylum: Arthropoda
- Class: Insecta
- Order: Diptera
- Superfamily: Empidoidea
- Family: Empididae
- Subfamily: Clinocerinae
- Genus: Phaeobalia
- Species: P. elongata

Binomial name
- Phaeobalia elongata (Wagner, 1982)

Synonyms
- Clinocera elongata Wagner, 1982

Species of fly

Phaeobalia elongata is a species of dance flies, in the fly family Empididae.
