= Hypenella spumarius =

Scientific classification
- Kingdom: Animalia
- Phylum: Arthropoda
- Class: Insecta
- Order: Diptera
- Superfamily: Empidoidea
- Family: Empididae
- Subfamily: Clinocerinae
- Genus: Hypenella
- Species: H. spumarius

Binomial name
- Hypenella spumarius Smith, 1965

Species of fly

Hypenella spumarius is a species of dance flies, in the fly family Empididae.

== Description ==
The humerus and the areas upper third to the half of the mesopleuron is brownish. Unlike the other species of Hypenella, this species' facial hairs are weaker. The prescutellar depression is darker than the thoraic disk, but it's flanked by a grayish patch under the 2 posterior dorsocentrals. The hypopygium with the terminal process is broadened towards the tip, but the hind tibiae has 2 or 3 short dorsal bristles before the tip. The wing stigma is narrow in indistinct. The species attains 2.5 cm.

== Distribution ==
The species is found in the Taplejung District in Dobhan and is found on the spray splashed rocks in the Tamur River.
