= Wiedemannia oxystoma =

Scientific classification
- Kingdom: Animalia
- Phylum: Arthropoda
- Clade: Pancrustacea
- Class: Insecta
- Order: Diptera
- Superfamily: Empidoidea
- Family: Empididae
- Subfamily: Clinocerinae
- Genus: Wiedemannia
- Species: W. oxystoma

Binomial name
- Wiedemannia oxystoma (Bezzi, 1905)

Species of fly

Wiedemannia oxystoma is a species of dance flies, in the fly family Empididae.
