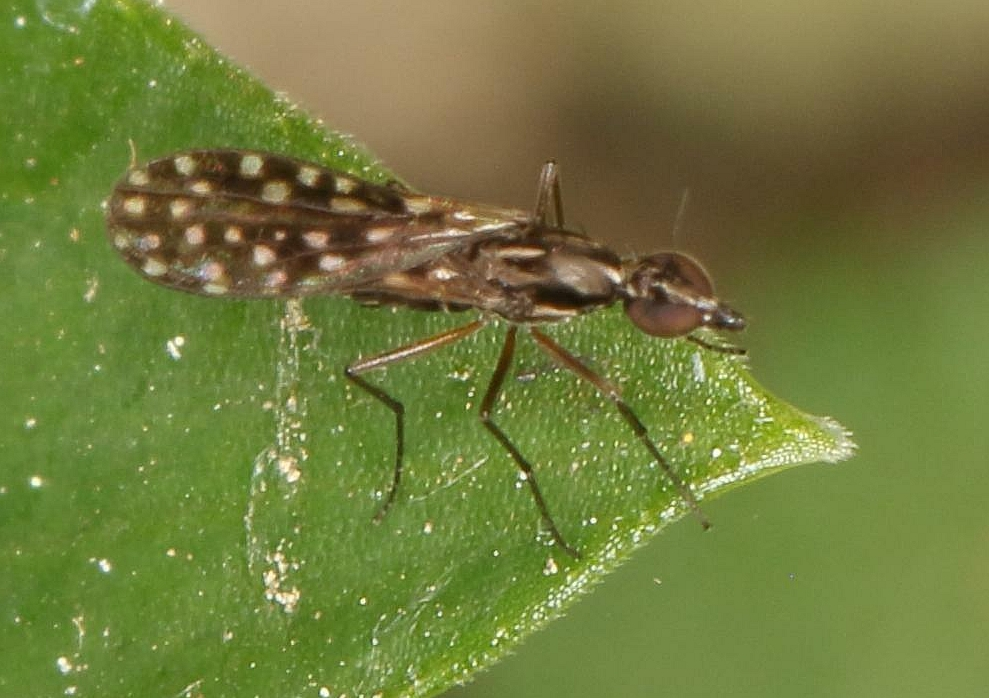

Scientific classification
- Kingdom: Animalia
- Phylum: Arthropoda
- Class: Insecta
- Order: Diptera
- Infraorder: Asilomorpha
- Superfamily: Empidoidea
- Family: Empididae
- Subfamily: Clinocerinae
- Genus: Dolichocephala
- Species: D. fuscilanx

Binomial name
- Dolichocephala fuscilanx Garrett Jones, 1940

= Dolichocephala fuscilanx =

Species of fly

Dolichocephala fuscilanx is a species of dance flies, in the fly family of Empididae.
