= Phaeobalia lynebrgi =

Scientific classification
- Kingdom: Animalia
- Phylum: Arthropoda
- Class: Insecta
- Order: Diptera
- Superfamily: Empidoidea
- Family: Empididae
- Subfamily: Clinocerinae
- Genus: Phaeobalia
- Species: P. lynebrgi

Binomial name
- Phaeobalia lynebrgi (Vaillant, 1973)

Synonyms
- Clinocera lynebrgi Vaillant, 1973

Species of fly

Phaeobalia lynebrgi is a species of dance flies, in the fly family Empididae.
