= Phaeobalia dimidiata =

Scientific classification
- Kingdom: Animalia
- Phylum: Arthropoda
- Clade: Pancrustacea
- Class: Insecta
- Order: Diptera
- Superfamily: Empidoidea
- Family: Empididae
- Subfamily: Clinocerinae
- Genus: Phaeobalia
- Species: P. dimidiata

Binomial name
- Phaeobalia dimidiata (Loew, 1869)

Synonyms
- Clinocera dimidiata Loew, 1869; Phaeobalia picta Strobl, 1893

Species of fly

Phaeobalia dimidiata is a species of dance flies, in the fly family Empididae.
