= Phaeobalia varipennis =

Scientific classification
- Kingdom: Animalia
- Phylum: Arthropoda
- Class: Insecta
- Order: Diptera
- Superfamily: Empidoidea
- Family: Empididae
- Subfamily: Clinocerinae
- Genus: Phaeobalia
- Species: P. varipennis

Binomial name
- Phaeobalia varipennis (Nowicki, 1868)

Synonyms
- Clinocera varipennis Nowicki, 1868)

Species of fly

Phaeobalia varipennis is a species of dance flies, in the fly family Empididae.
