= Dolichocephala afflicta =

Scientific classification
- Kingdom: Animalia
- Phylum: Arthropoda
- Clade: Pancrustacea
- Class: Insecta
- Order: Diptera
- Infraorder: Asilomorpha
- Superfamily: Empidoidea
- Family: Empididae
- Subfamily: Clinocerinae
- Genus: Dolichocephala
- Species: D. afflicta

Binomial name
- Dolichocephala afflicta Sinclair & MacDonald, 2012

Species of fly

Dolichocephala afflicta is a species of dance flies, in the fly family Empididae.
