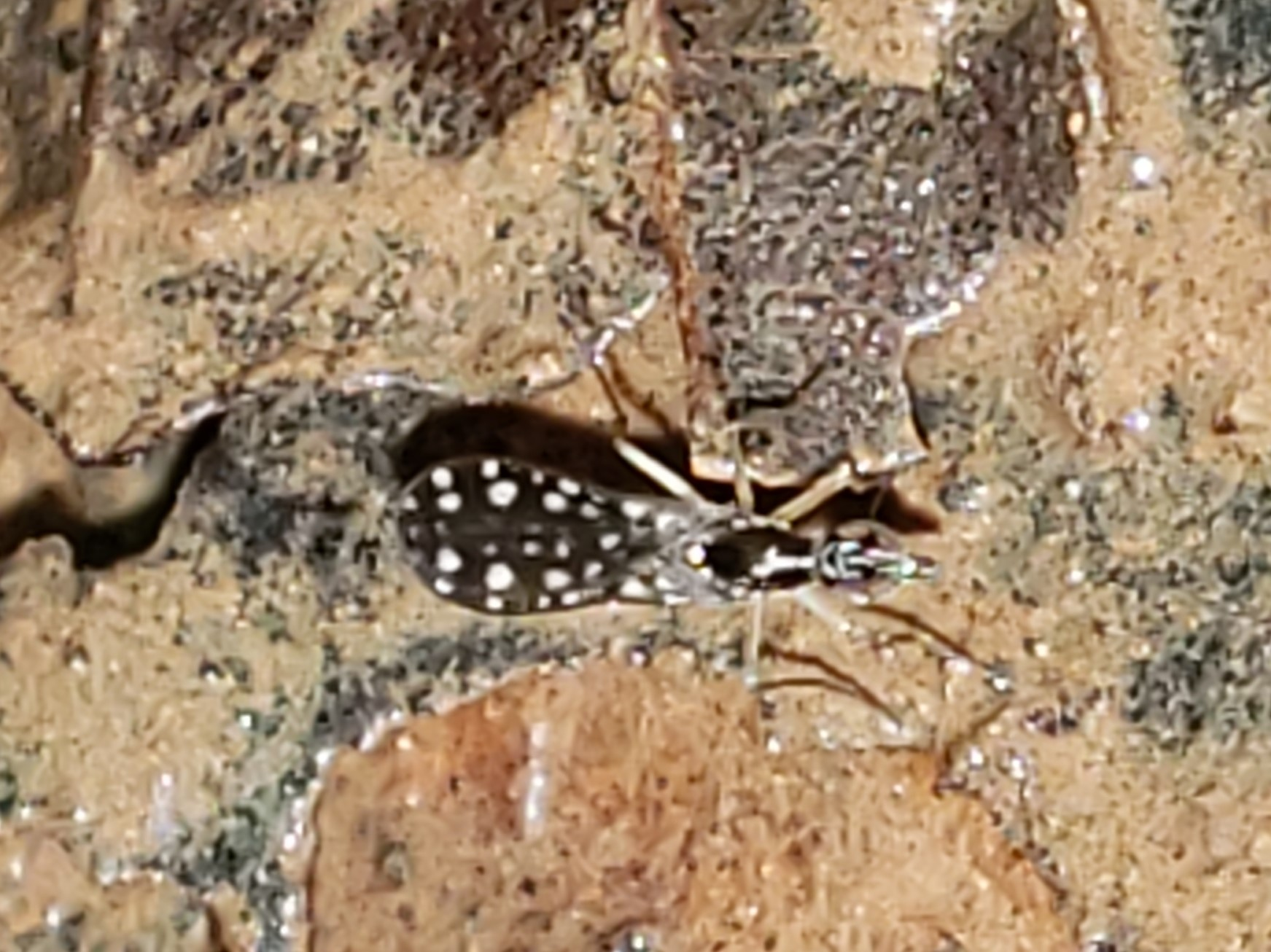

Scientific classification
- Kingdom: Animalia
- Phylum: Arthropoda
- Clade: Pancrustacea
- Class: Insecta
- Order: Diptera
- Infraorder: Asilomorpha
- Superfamily: Empidoidea
- Family: Empididae
- Subfamily: Clinocerinae
- Genus: Dolichocephala
- Species: D. vockerothi

Binomial name
- Dolichocephala vockerothi Sinclair & MacDonald, 2012

= Dolichocephala vockerothi =

Species of fly

Dolichocephala vockerothi is a species of dance fly in the family Empididae.
