= Phaeobalia peniscissa =

Scientific classification
- Kingdom: Animalia
- Phylum: Arthropoda
- Class: Insecta
- Order: Diptera
- Superfamily: Empidoidea
- Family: Empididae
- Subfamily: Clinocerinae
- Genus: Phaeobalia
- Species: P. peniscissa

Binomial name
- Phaeobalia peniscissa (Becker, 1889)

Synonyms
- Clinocera peniscissa Becker, 1889

Species of fly

Phaeobalia peniscissa is a species of dance flies, in the fly family Empididae.
