= Dolichocephala humanitatis =

Scientific classification
- Kingdom: Animalia
- Phylum: Arthropoda
- Class: Insecta
- Order: Diptera
- Infraorder: Asilomorpha
- Superfamily: Empidoidea
- Family: Empididae
- Subfamily: Clinocerinae
- Genus: Dolichocephala
- Species: D. humanitatis

Binomial name
- Dolichocephala humanitatis Garrett Jones, 1940

Species of fly

Dolichocephala humanitatis is a species of dance flies, in the fly family Empididae.
