= Brachymerini =

Scientific classification
- Kingdom: Animalia
- Phylum: Arthropoda
- Class: Insecta
- Order: Diptera
- Family: Tachinidae
- Subfamily: Tachininae
- Tribe: Brachymerini

Tribe of flies

Brachymerini is a tribe of flies in the family Tachinidae.

== Genera ==
- Brachymera Brauer & Bergenstamm, 1889
- Neoemdenia Mesnil, 1953
- Pelamera Herting, 1969
- Pseudopachystylum Mik, 1891
