= Dolichocephala austriaca =

Scientific classification
- Kingdom: Animalia
- Phylum: Arthropoda
- Class: Insecta
- Order: Diptera
- Infraorder: Asilomorpha
- Superfamily: Empidoidea
- Family: Empididae
- Subfamily: Clinocerinae
- Genus: Dolichocephala
- Species: D. austriaca

Binomial name
- Dolichocephala austriaca Vaillant, 1968

Species of insect

Dolichocephala austriaca is a species of dance fly, in the fly family Empididae.
