= Pseudopachystylum =

Scientific classification
- Kingdom: Animalia
- Phylum: Arthropoda
- Clade: Pancrustacea
- Class: Insecta
- Order: Diptera
- Family: Tachinidae
- Subfamily: Tachininae
- Tribe: Brachymerini
- Genus: Pseudopachystylum; Mik, 1891

Type species
- Pseudopachystylum wachtlii Mik, 1891

Synonyms
- Eubrachymera Townsend, 1919

Genus of flies

Pseudopachystylum is a genus of flies in the family Tachinidae. It is a parasitoid of sawflies from the family Pamphiliidae.

== Species ==
- Pseudopachystylum debile (Townsend, 1919)
- Pseudopachystylum gonioides (Zetterstedt, 1838)
- Pseudopachystylum marginale (Mesnil & Shima, 1978)
