= Phaeobalia =

Scientific classification
- Kingdom: Animalia
- Phylum: Arthropoda
- Clade: Pancrustacea
- Class: Insecta
- Order: Diptera
- Family: Empididae
- Subfamily: Clinocerinae
- Genus: Phaeobalia; Mik, 1881

Type species
- Clinocera trinotata Mik, 1869

Genus of flies

Phaeobalia is a genus of flies in the family Empididae.

== Species ==
- P. brevitibia (Melander, 1928)
- P. dimidiata (Loew, 1869)
- P. elapha (Vaillant, 1968)
- P. elongata (Wagner, 1982)
- P. inermis (Loew, 1861)
- P. lecta (Melander, 1902)
- P. lynebrgi (Vaillant & Chvála, 1973)
- P. maculata (Vaillant, 1964)
- P. montana (Vaillant, 1973)
- P. orophila (Vaillant, 1973)
- P. peniscissa (Becker, 1889)
- P. pokornyi Mik, 1886
- P. ramosa (Vaillant, 1964)
- P. tetrastyla (Vaillant, 1973)
- P. trinotata (Mik, 1869)
- P. vaillanti (Wagner, 1982)
- P. varipennis (Nowicki, 1868)
- P. zwicki (Vaillant & Vincon, 1987)
