= Wiedemannia bistigma =

Scientific classification
- Kingdom: Animalia
- Phylum: Arthropoda
- Class: Insecta
- Order: Diptera
- Superfamily: Empidoidea
- Family: Empididae
- Subfamily: Clinocerinae
- Genus: Wiedemannia
- Species: W. bistigma

Binomial name
- Wiedemannia bistigma (Curtis, 1834)

Synonyms
- Gloma bistigma Curtis, 1834

Species of fly

Wiedemannia bistigma is a species of dance flies, in the fly family Empididae.
