= Solieria =

Solieria may refer to:

- Solieria (alga), a red alga genus in the family Solieriaceae
- Solieria (fly), a fly genus in the family Tachinidae
