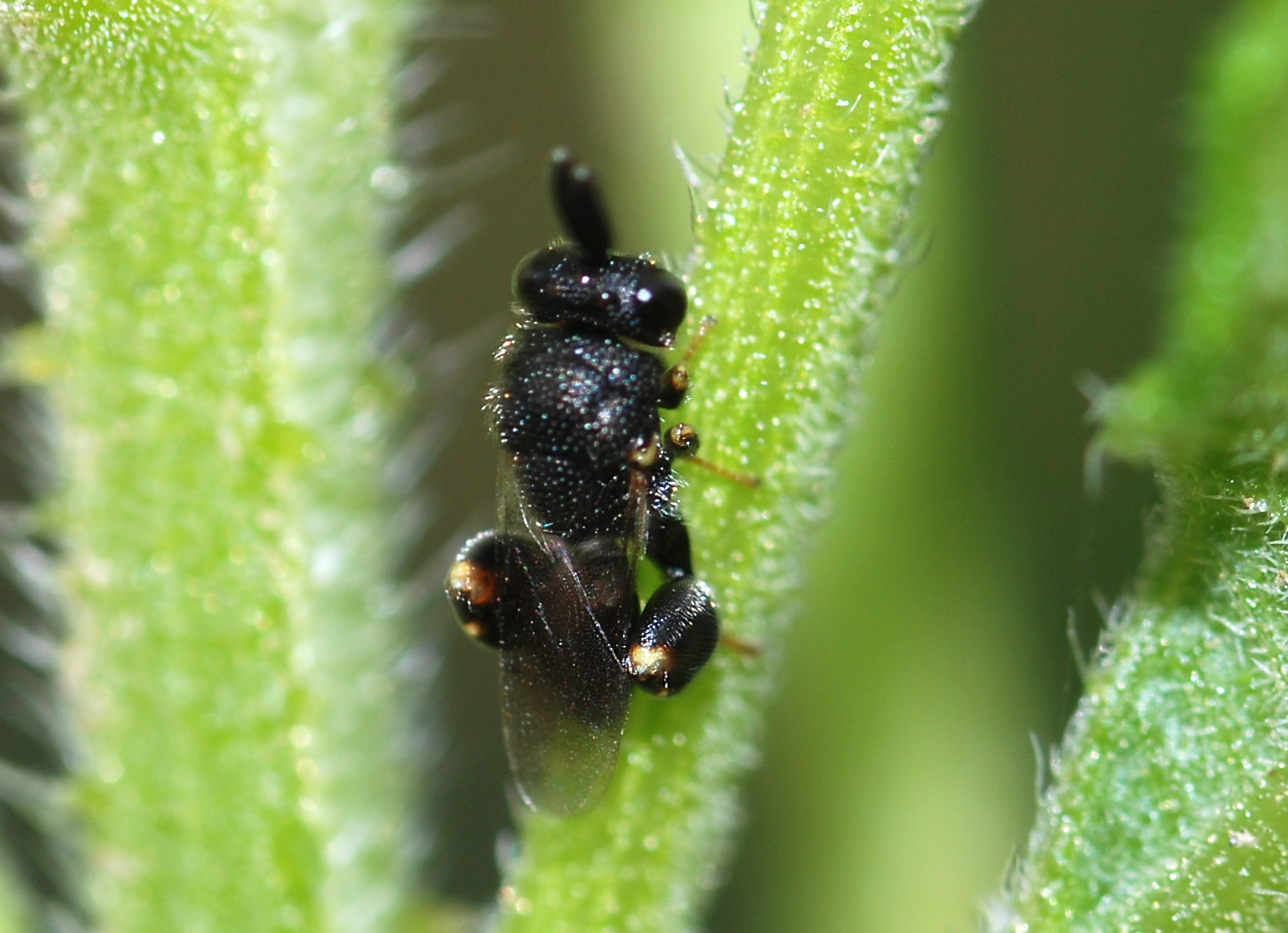

Scientific classification
- Kingdom: Animalia
- Phylum: Arthropoda
- Clade: Pancrustacea
- Class: Insecta
- Order: Diptera
- Family: Tachinidae
- Subfamily: Tachininae
- Tribe: Brachymerini
- Genus: Brachymera; Brauer & Bergenstamm, 1889

Type species
- Pachystylum letochai Mik, 1874

Synonyms
- Parabrachymera Mik, 1891

= Brachymera =

Genus of flies

Brachymera is a genus of flies in the family Tachinidae.

== Species ==
- Brachymera letochai (Mik, 1874)
- Brachymera rugosa (Mik, 1863)
