= Dolichocephala arnaudi =

Scientific classification
- Kingdom: Animalia
- Phylum: Arthropoda
- Class: Insecta
- Order: Diptera
- Infraorder: Asilomorpha
- Superfamily: Empidoidea
- Family: Empididae
- Subfamily: Clinocerinae
- Genus: Dolichocephala
- Species: D. arnaudi

Binomial name
- Dolichocephala arnaudi Sinclair & MacDonald, 2012

Species of fly

Dolichocephala arnaudi is a species of dagger flies, in the fly family Empididae.
