= Hypenella empodiata =

Scientific classification
- Kingdom: Animalia
- Phylum: Arthropoda
- Class: Insecta
- Order: Diptera
- Superfamily: Empidoidea
- Family: Empididae
- Subfamily: Clinocerinae
- Genus: Hypenella
- Species: H. empodiata

Binomial name
- Hypenella empodiata Collin, 1941

Species of fly

Hypenella empodiata is a species of dance flies, in the fly family Empididae.

== Distribution ==
The species is found in the far east of Russia, particularly in the Primorskiy Territory in the village of Tigrovaya.
