= Dolichocephala maculatissima =

Scientific classification
- Kingdom: Animalia
- Phylum: Arthropoda
- Class: Insecta
- Order: Diptera
- Infraorder: Asilomorpha
- Superfamily: Empidoidea
- Family: Empididae
- Subfamily: Clinocerinae
- Genus: Dolichocephala
- Species: D. maculatissima

Binomial name
- Dolichocephala maculatissima Garrett Jones, 1940

Species of fly

Dolichocephala maculatissima is a species of dance fly in the family Empididae.
