= Phaeobalia inermis =

Scientific classification
- Kingdom: Animalia
- Phylum: Arthropoda
- Clade: Pancrustacea
- Class: Insecta
- Order: Diptera
- Superfamily: Empidoidea
- Family: Empididae
- Subfamily: Clinocerinae
- Genus: Phaeobalia
- Species: P. inermis

Binomial name
- Phaeobalia inermis (Loew, 1861)

Synonyms
- Clinocera inermis Loew, 1861

Species of fly

Phaeobalia inermis is a species of dance flies, in the fly family Empididae.
