= Wiedemannia languedocica =

Scientific classification
- Kingdom: Animalia
- Phylum: Arthropoda
- Class: Insecta
- Order: Diptera
- Superfamily: Empidoidea
- Family: Empididae
- Subfamily: Clinocerinae
- Genus: Wiedemannia
- Species: W. languedocica

Binomial name
- Wiedemannia languedocica Vaillant, 1964

Species of fly

Wiedemannia languedocica is a species of dance flies, in the fly family Empididae.
