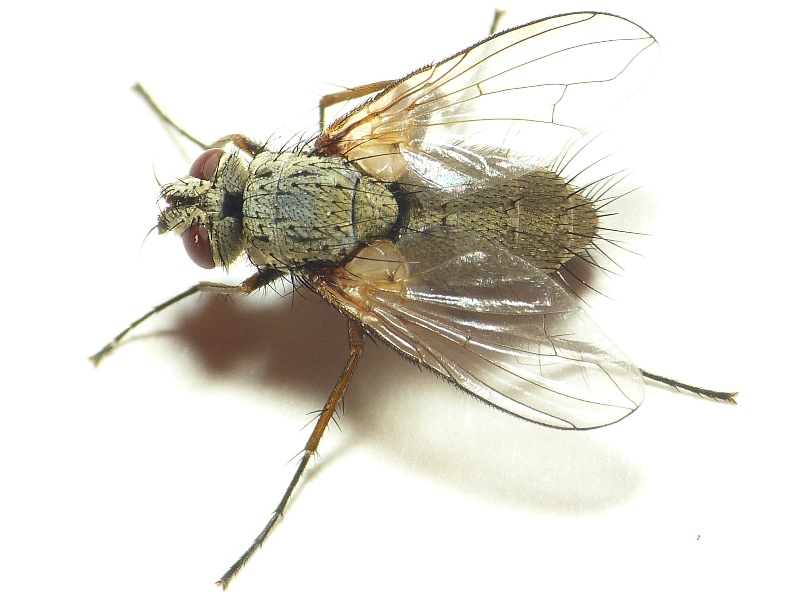
- Solieria pacifica

Scientific classification
- Kingdom: Animalia
- Phylum: Arthropoda
- Clade: Pancrustacea
- Class: Insecta
- Order: Diptera
- Family: Tachinidae
- Subfamily: Tachininae
- Tribe: Leskiini
- Genus: Solieria; Robineau-Desvoidy, 1849

Type species
- Tachina inanis Fallén, 1810

Synonyms
- Myobia Robineau-Desvoidy, 1830 (Preocc.); Myoba Blanchard, 1845; Mijobia Doleschall, 1856; Anthoica Rondani, 1861; Myiobia Mik, 1890; Micromyobia Brauer & von Berganstamm, 1891; Anthoeca Bezzi, 1906; Micromyiobia Bezzi, 1907; Apachemyia Townsend, 1908; Neofischeria Townsend, 1908; Parafischeria Townsend, 1908; Parademoticus Townsend, 1916; Solieriopsis Reinhard, 1967

= Solieria (fly) =

Genus of flies

Solieria is a genus of flies in the family Tachinidae.

== Species ==
- Solieria aureola Mesnil, 1973
- Solieria borealis Ringdahl, 1947
- Solieria boreotis (Reinhard, 1967)
- Solieria eucerata (Bigot, 1889)
- Solieria fenestrata (Meigen, 1824)
- Solieria flava (Townsend, 1908)
- Solieria inanis (Fallén, 1810)
- Solieria munda Richter, 1975
- Solieria murina Richter, 1980
- Solieria pacifica (Meigen, 1824)
- Solieria pallida (Coquillett, 1897)
- Solieria piperi (Coquillett, 1897)
- Solieria vacua (Rondani, 1861)
