= Hypenella =

Scientific classification
- Domain: Eukaryota
- Kingdom: Animalia
- Phylum: Arthropoda
- Class: Insecta
- Order: Diptera
- Infraorder: Asilomorpha
- Superfamily: Empidoidea
- Family: Empididae
- Subfamily: Clinocerinae
- Genus: Hypenella; Collin, 1941

Type species
- Hypenella empodiata Collin, 1941

Genus of flies

Hypenella is a genus of flies in the family Empididae.

== Species ==
- H. bhura Smith, 1965
- H. empodiata Collin, 1941
- H. spumarius Smith, 1965
