= Neoemdenia =

Scientific classification
- Kingdom: Animalia
- Phylum: Arthropoda
- Class: Insecta
- Order: Diptera
- Family: Tachinidae
- Subfamily: Tachininae
- Tribe: Brachymerini
- Genus: Neoemdenia; Mesnil, 1953

Type species
- Neoemdenia mirabilis Mesnil, 1953

Genus of flies

Neoemdenia is a genus of flies in the family Tachinidae.

== Species ==
- Neoemdenia mirabilis Mesnil, 1953
- Neoemdenia mudanjiangensis Hou & Zhang, 2014
