= Wiedemannia hughesi =

Scientific classification
- Kingdom: Animalia
- Phylum: Arthropoda
- Class: Insecta
- Order: Diptera
- Family: Empididae
- Genus: Wiedemannia
- Species: W. hughesi

Binomial name
- Wiedemannia hughesi Smith, 1969

Species of fly

Wiedemannia hughesi is a species of dance flies, in the fly family Empididae.
