= Wiedemannia insularis =

Scientific classification
- Kingdom: Animalia
- Phylum: Arthropoda
- Class: Insecta
- Order: Diptera
- Family: Empididae
- Genus: Wiedemannia
- Species: W. insularis

Binomial name
- Wiedemannia insularis Collin, 1927

Species of fly

Wiedemannia insularis is a species of dance flies, in the fly family Empididae.
