= Solieria vacua =

Scientific classification
- Kingdom: Animalia
- Phylum: Arthropoda
- Clade: Pancrustacea
- Class: Insecta
- Order: Diptera
- Family: Tachinidae
- Subfamily: Tachininae
- Tribe: Leskiini
- Genus: Solieria
- Species: S. vacua

Binomial name
- Solieria vacua (Rondani, 1861)

Synonyms
- Pyrrosia vacua Rondani, 1861

Species of fly

Solieria vacua is a European species of fly in the family Tachinidae.

== Distribution ==
British Isles, Czech Republic, Hungary, Poland, Romania, Slovakia, Ukraine, Bulgaria, Italy, Slovenia, Spain, Austria, Belgium, France, Germany, Switzerland, Russia.
