= Rhyacodromia =

Scientific classification
- Domain: Eukaryota
- Kingdom: Animalia
- Phylum: Arthropoda
- Class: Insecta
- Order: Diptera
- Family: Empididae
- Subfamily: Clinocerinae
- Genus: Rhyacodromia; Saigusa, 1986

Type species
- Rhyacodromia flavicoxa Saigusa, 1986

Genus of flies

Rhyacodromia is a genus of flies in the family Empididae.

== Species ==
- R. flavicoxa Saigusa, 1986
