= Dolichocephala =

- Dolichocephala irrorata in copula

Scientific classification
- Domain: Eukaryota
- Kingdom: Animalia
- Phylum: Arthropoda
- Class: Insecta
- Order: Diptera
- Family: Empididae
- Subfamily: Clinocerinae
- Genus: Dolichocephala; Macquart, 1823

Synonyms
- Ardoptera Macquart, 1827; Leptosceles Haliday, 1833; Obstinocephala Garrett Jones, 1940; Fur Garrett Jones, 1940

Genus of flies

Dolichocephala is a genus of dagger flies in the family Empididae. There are at least 50 described species in Dolichocephala.

== Species ==
These 51 species belong to the genus Dolichocephala:

- D. afflicta Garrett Jones, 1940^{c g}
- D. argus Melander, 1927^{i c g b}
- D. arnaudi Sinclair & MacDonald, 2012
- D. austriaca Vaillant, 1968^{c g}
- D. bartaki Wagner, 1998^{c g}
- D. basilicata Wagner, 1995^{c g}
- D. bellstedti Joost, 1985^{c g}
- D. bicolor Sinclair & Plant, 2017^{g}
- D. borkenti Sinclair & MacDonald, 2012
- D. cavaticum Becker, 1889^{c g}
- D. chillcotti Sinclair & MacDonald, 2012
- D. ciwatikina Sinclair, 2005^{c g}
- D. combinata Becker, 1914^{c g}
- D. cretica Wagner, 1995^{c g}
- D. curvata Sinclair & Plant, 2017^{g}
- D. duodecempunctata Smith, 1969^{c g}
- D. flamingo Smith, 1965^{c g}
- D. fugitivus Garrett Jones, 1940^{c g}
- D. fuscilanx Garrett Jones, 1940^{c g}
- D. guangdongensis Yang, Rootaert & Horvat, 2004^{c g}
- D. guttata (Haliday, 1833)^{c g}
- D. humanitatis Garrett Jones, 1940^{c g}
- D. immaculata Sinclair & Plant, 2017^{g}
- D. incus Sinclair & Plant, 2017^{g}
- D. irroata (Fallén, 1815)^{i c g}
- D. irrorata (Fallén, 1816)^{c g}
- D. longicerca Sinclair & Plant, 2017^{g}
- D. maculatissima Garrett Jones, 1940^{c g}
- D. malickyi Wagner, 1995^{c g}
- D. meyi Joost, 1990^{c g}
- D. monae Joost, 1981^{c g}
- D. oblongoguttata (Dale, 1878)
- D. ocellata (Costa, 1854)^{c g}
- D. panesari Wagner, Leese & Panesar, 2004^{c g}
- D. pavonica Vaillant & Gagneur, 1998^{c g}
- D. quadrispina Smith, 1969^{c g}
- D. rarinota Garrett Jones, 1940^{c g}
- D. rotundinota Wagner, Leese & Panesar, 2004^{c g}
- D. septemontata Brunetti, 1913
- D. sinica Horvat, 1994^{c g}
- D. sparsa Becker, 1914^{c g}
- D. srisukai Sinclair & Plant, 2017^{g}
- D. tali Garrett Jones, 1940^{c g}
- D. teskeyi Sinclair & MacDonald, 2012
- D. thailandensis Sinclair & Plant, 2017^{g}
- D. thomasi Wagner, 1983^{g}
- D. vaillanti Wagner, 1995^{c g}
- D. vockerothi Sinclair & MacDonald, 2012
- D. walutikina Sinclair, 2005^{c g}
- D. woodi Sinclair & MacDonald, 2012
- D. zwicki Wagner, 1995^{c g}

Data sources: i = ITIS, c = Catalogue of Life, g = GBIF, b = Bugguide.net
