= Solieria inanis =

Scientific classification
- Kingdom: Animalia
- Phylum: Arthropoda
- Clade: Pancrustacea
- Class: Insecta
- Order: Diptera
- Family: Tachinidae
- Subfamily: Tachininae
- Tribe: Leskiini
- Genus: Solieria
- Species: S. inanis

Binomial name
- Solieria inanis (Fallén, 1810)

Synonyms
- Tachina inanis Fallén, 1810; Tachina longipes Meigen, 1824; Myobia fragilis Robineau-Desvoidy, 1830; Myobia sublutea Robineau-Desvoidy, 1830; Myobia flavida Macquart, 1854; Solieria brunicosa Robineau-Desvoidy, 1849

Species of fly

Solieria inanis is a European species of fly in the family Tachinidae.

== Distribution ==
British Isles, Czech Republic, Estonia, Hungary, Lithuania, Poland, Romania, Slovakia, Ukraine, Denmark, Finland, Sweden, Bosnia and Herzegovina, Italy, Slovenia, Spain, Austria, Belgium, France, Germany, Netherlands, Switzerland, Japan, Russia.
