= Wiedemannia gorongoza =

Scientific classification
- Kingdom: Animalia
- Phylum: Arthropoda
- Clade: Pancrustacea
- Class: Insecta
- Order: Diptera
- Family: Empididae
- Genus: Wiedemannia
- Species: W. gorongoza

Binomial name
- Wiedemannia gorongoza Smith, 1969

Species of fly

Wiedemannia gorongoza is a species of dance flies, in the fly family Empididae.
