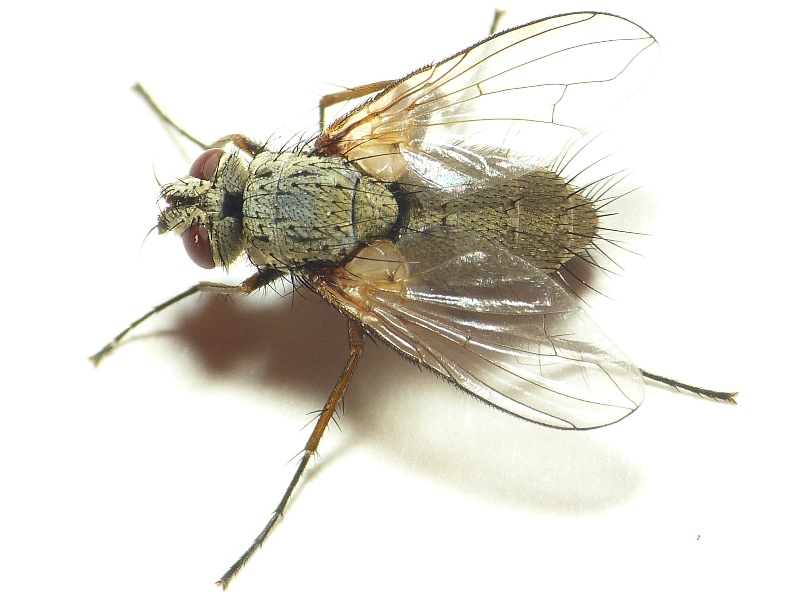
- Solieria pacifica

Scientific classification
- Kingdom: Animalia
- Phylum: Arthropoda
- Clade: Pancrustacea
- Class: Insecta
- Order: Diptera
- Family: Tachinidae
- Subfamily: Tachininae
- Tribe: Leskiini
- Genus: Solieria
- Species: S. pacifica

Binomial name
- Solieria pacifica (Meigen, 1824)

Synonyms
- Tachina pacifica Meigen, 1824; Myobia ruficrus Robineau-Desvoidy, 1830; Tachina tibialis Roser, 1840; Solieria brunicosa Robineau-Desvoidy, 1849; Myobia nitidiventris Macquart, 1854; Pyrrosia diaphana Rondani, 1861; Micromyobia montana Brauer & von Bergenstamm, 1891

= Solieria pacifica =

Species of fly

Solieria pacifica is a European species of fly in the family Tachinidae.

== Distribution ==
British Isles, Czech Republic, Estonia, Hungary, Lithuania, Moldova, Poland, Romania, Slovakia, Ukraine, Denmark, Finland, Norway, Sweden, Bosnia and Herzegovina, Bulgaria, Italy, Serbia, Slovenia, Spain, Austria, Belgium, France, Germany, Netherlands, Switzerland, Russia, China, Transcaucasia.
