= Wiedemannia nevadensis =

Scientific classification
- Kingdom: Animalia
- Phylum: Arthropoda
- Class: Insecta
- Order: Diptera
- Family: Empididae
- Genus: Wiedemannia
- Species: W. nevadensis

Binomial name
- Wiedemannia nevadensis Wagner, 1990

Species of fly

Wiedemannia nevadensis is a species of dance flies, in the fly family Empididae.
