= Wiedemannia digna =

Scientific classification
- Kingdom: Animalia
- Phylum: Arthropoda
- Class: Insecta
- Order: Diptera
- Family: Empididae
- Genus: Wiedemannia
- Species: W. digna

Binomial name
- Wiedemannia digna Sinclair, 2006

Species of fly

Wiedemannia digna is a species of dance flies, in the fly family Empididae.
