= Dolichocephala argus =

Scientific classification
- Domain: Eukaryota
- Kingdom: Animalia
- Phylum: Arthropoda
- Class: Insecta
- Order: Diptera
- Family: Empididae
- Genus: Dolichocephala
- Species: D. argus

Binomial name
- Dolichocephala argus Melander, 1927

Species of fly

Dolichocephala argus is a species of dance fly in the family Empididae.
