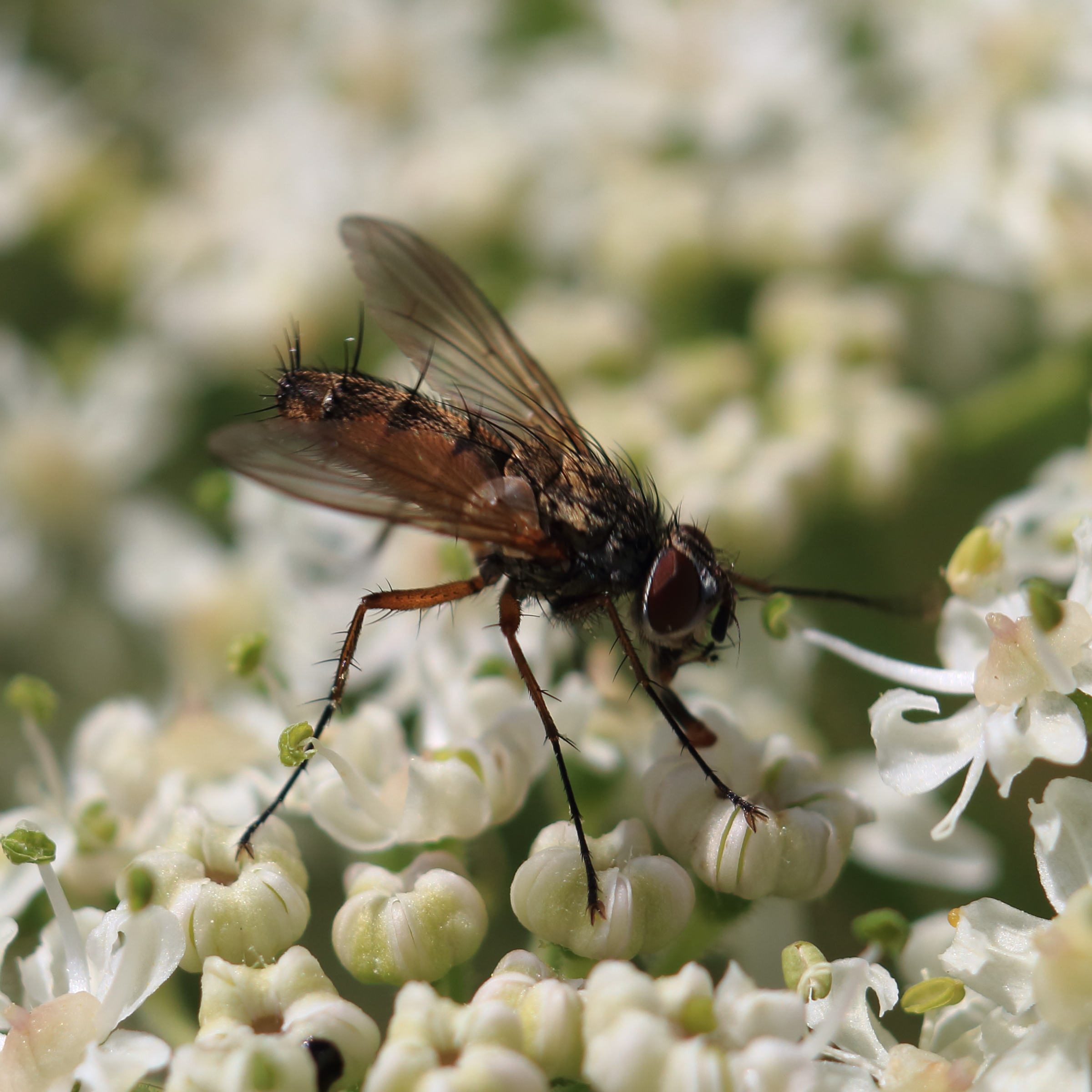
- Solieria fenestrata

Scientific classification
- Kingdom: Animalia
- Phylum: Arthropoda
- Clade: Pancrustacea
- Class: Insecta
- Order: Diptera
- Family: Tachinidae
- Subfamily: Tachininae
- Tribe: Leskiini
- Genus: Solieria
- Species: S. fenestrata

Binomial name
- Solieria fenestrata (Meigen, 1824)

Synonyms
- Tachina fenestrata Meigen, 1824; Solieria fuscana Robineau-Desvoidy, 1849; Solieria fuscana Robineau-Desvoidy, 1849; Solieria palpalis Robineau-Desvoidy, 1863; Clytia rotundiventris Meade, 1892

= Solieria fenestrata =

Species of fly

Solieria fenestrata is a European species of fly in the family Tachinidae.

== Distribution ==
British Isles, Czech Republic, Estonia, Hungary, Moldova, Poland, Romania, Slovakia, Ukraine, Andorra, Bulgaria, Croatia, Italy, Serbia, Slovenia, Spain, Turkey, Austria, Belgium, France, Germany, Netherlands, Switzerland, Russia, Transcaucasia.
