= Pelamera =

Scientific classification
- Kingdom: Animalia
- Phylum: Arthropoda
- Clade: Pancrustacea
- Class: Insecta
- Order: Diptera
- Family: Tachinidae
- Subfamily: Tachininae
- Tribe: Brachymerini
- Genus: Pelamera; Herting, 1969

Type species
- Myobia atra

Synonyms
- Palamera Tobias, 1993

Genus of flies

Pelamera is a genus of flies in the family Tachinidae.

== Species ==
- Pelamera atra (Rondani, 1861)
