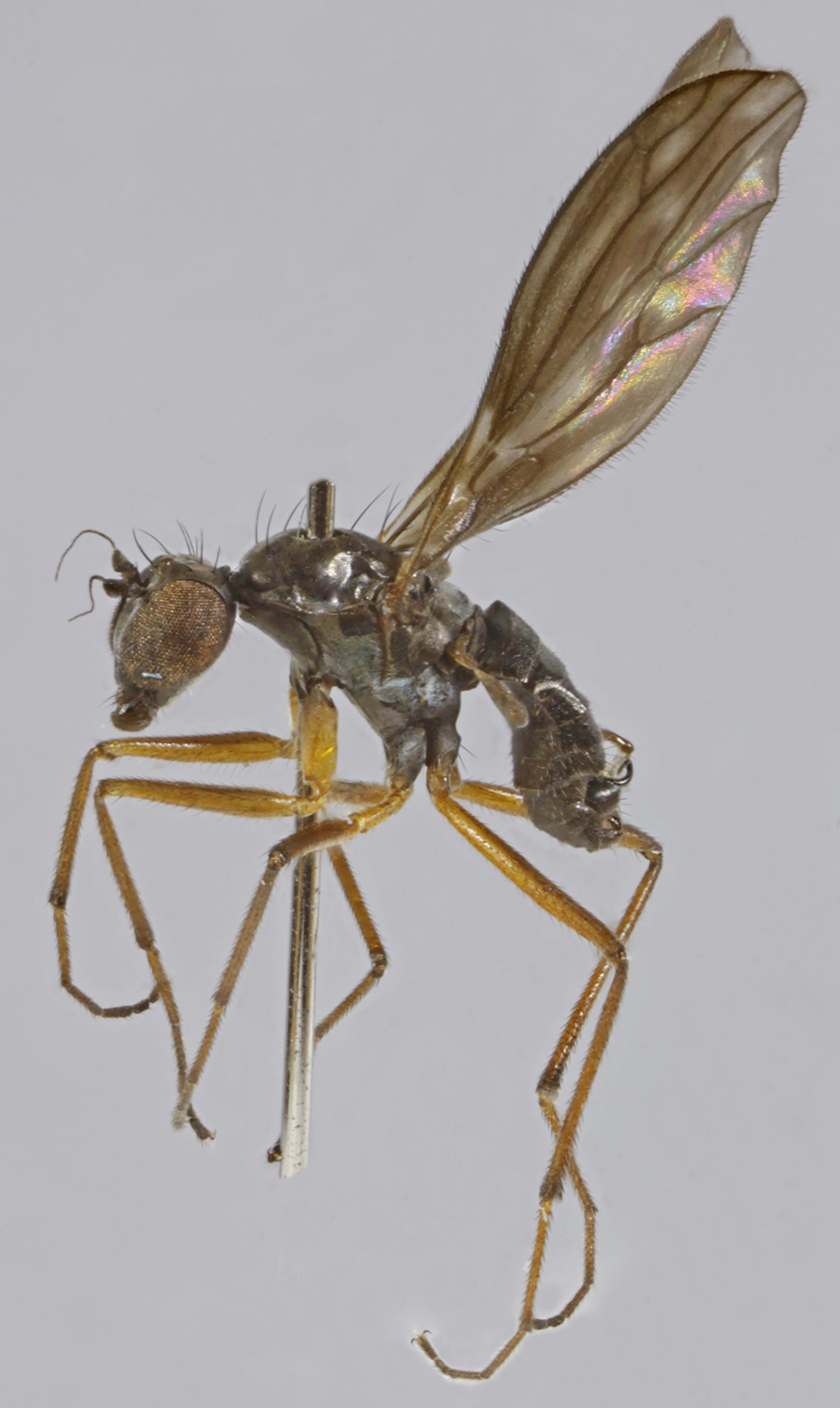
- Dolichocephala guttata North Wales

Scientific classification
- Kingdom: Animalia
- Phylum: Arthropoda
- Clade: Pancrustacea
- Class: Insecta
- Order: Diptera
- Family: Empididae
- Genus: Dolichocephala
- Species: D. guttata

Binomial name
- Dolichocephala guttata (Haliday, 1833)

Synonyms
- Leptosceles guttata Haliday, 1833; Leptosceles exoleta Haliday, 1833

= Dolichocephala guttata =

Species of fly

Dolichocephala guttata is a species of fly in the family Empididae. It is found in the Palearctic.
