= Vodopadnaya =

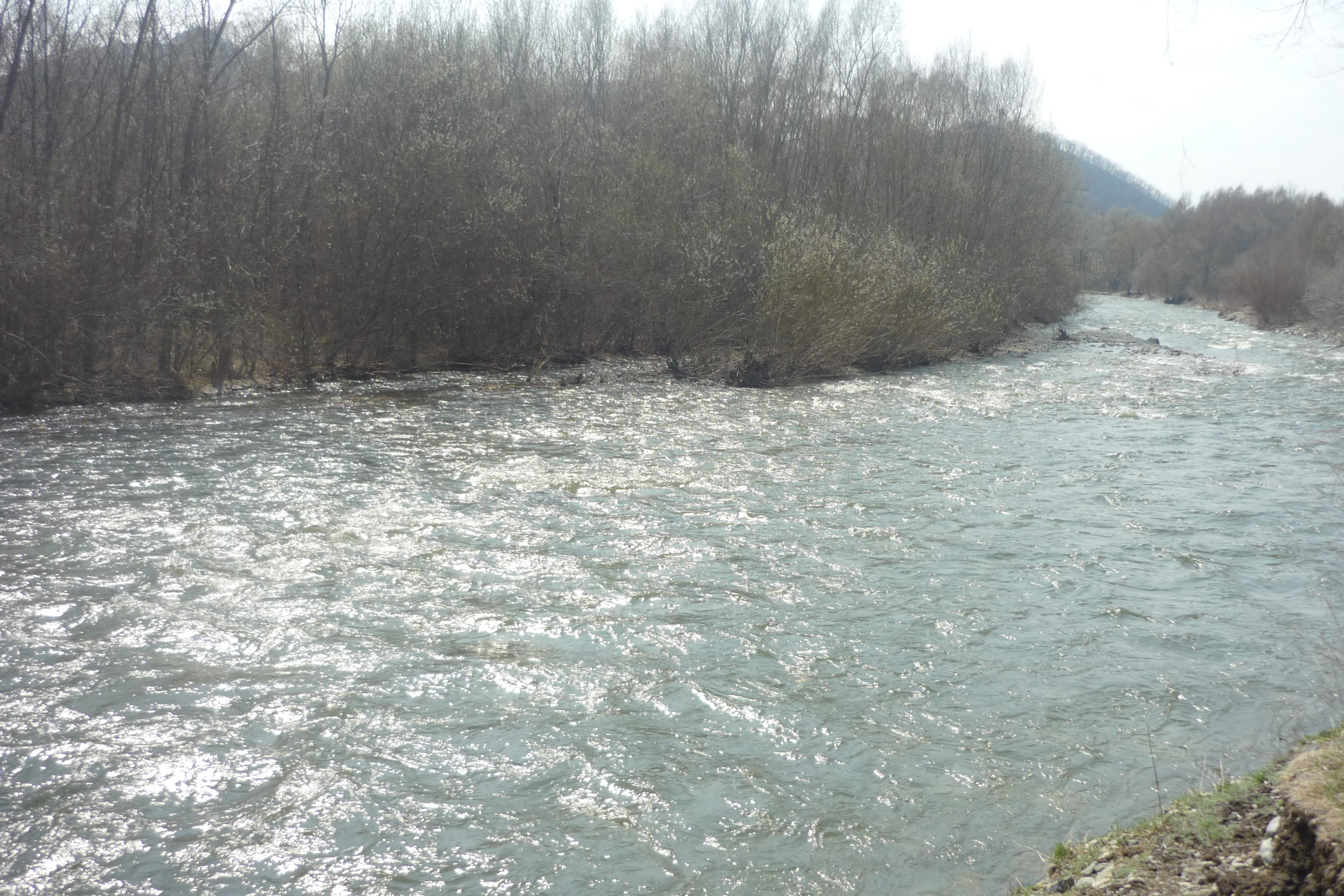
- The Vodopadnaya near its mouth

Location
- Country: Russia

Physical characteristics
- Mouth: Partizanskaya
  - coordinates: 43.1074°N 133.1985°E
- Length: 36 km (22 mi)
- Basin size: 190 km^{2} (73 sq mi)

Basin features
- Progression: Partizanskaya→ Sea of Japan

The Vodopadnaya (Russian: Водопадная, lit. "Waterfalls River", formerly: Шиненгоу Shinengou) is a river in Primorsky Krai, in the far eastern region of Russia.

Its length is 36 kilometres (22 mi), and its river basin covers 190 square kilometres (73 mi^{2}). Its mouth is in Nikolayevka, Partizansky District, and its source is in Southern Sikhote-Alin at 1,337 metres (4,386 ft) above sea level. It is a left tributary of the Partizanskaya.
