= Partizanskaya (river) =

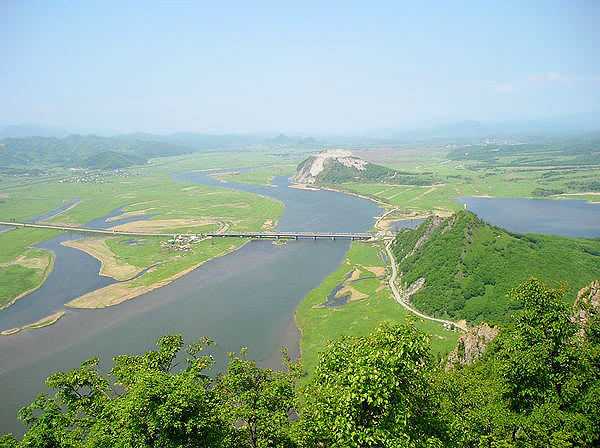
- The mouth of Partizanskaya near Nakhodka, seen from Sopka Sestra

Location
- Country: Russia

Physical characteristics
- Mouth: Sea of Japan
  - coordinates: 42°49′41″N 132°58′47″E
- Length: 142 km (88 mi)
- Basin size: 4,140 km^{2} (1,600 sq mi)

The Partizanskaya (Russian: Партизанская, formerly Сучан Suchan) is a river in Primorsky Krai. Its length is 142 kilometres (88 mi), and its drainage basin covers 4,140 square kilometres (1,600 sq mi). Its sources are in South Sikhote-Alin in Partizansky District; the mouth empties into Nakhodka Bay in the Sea of Japan. Its tributaries include the Tigrovaya, which is 53 kilometres (33 mi) long, as well as the smaller rivers Melniki and Vodopadnaya.
