= Wiedemannia debilis =

Scientific classification
- Kingdom: Animalia
- Phylum: Arthropoda
- Class: Insecta
- Order: Diptera
- Family: Empididae
- Genus: Wiedemannia
- Species: W. debilis

Binomial name
- Wiedemannia debilis Collin, 1961

Species of fly

Wiedemannia debilis is a species of dance flies, in the fly family Empididae.
