= Proagomyia =

Scientific classification
- Domain: Eukaryota
- Kingdom: Animalia
- Phylum: Arthropoda
- Class: Insecta
- Order: Diptera
- Family: Empididae
- Subfamily: Clinocerinae
- Genus: Proagomyia; Collin, 1933

Type species
- Proagomyia torrentium Collin, 1933

Genus of flies

Proagomyia is a genus of flies in the family Empididae.

== Species ==
- P. torrentium Collin, 1933
