= Tigrovaya =

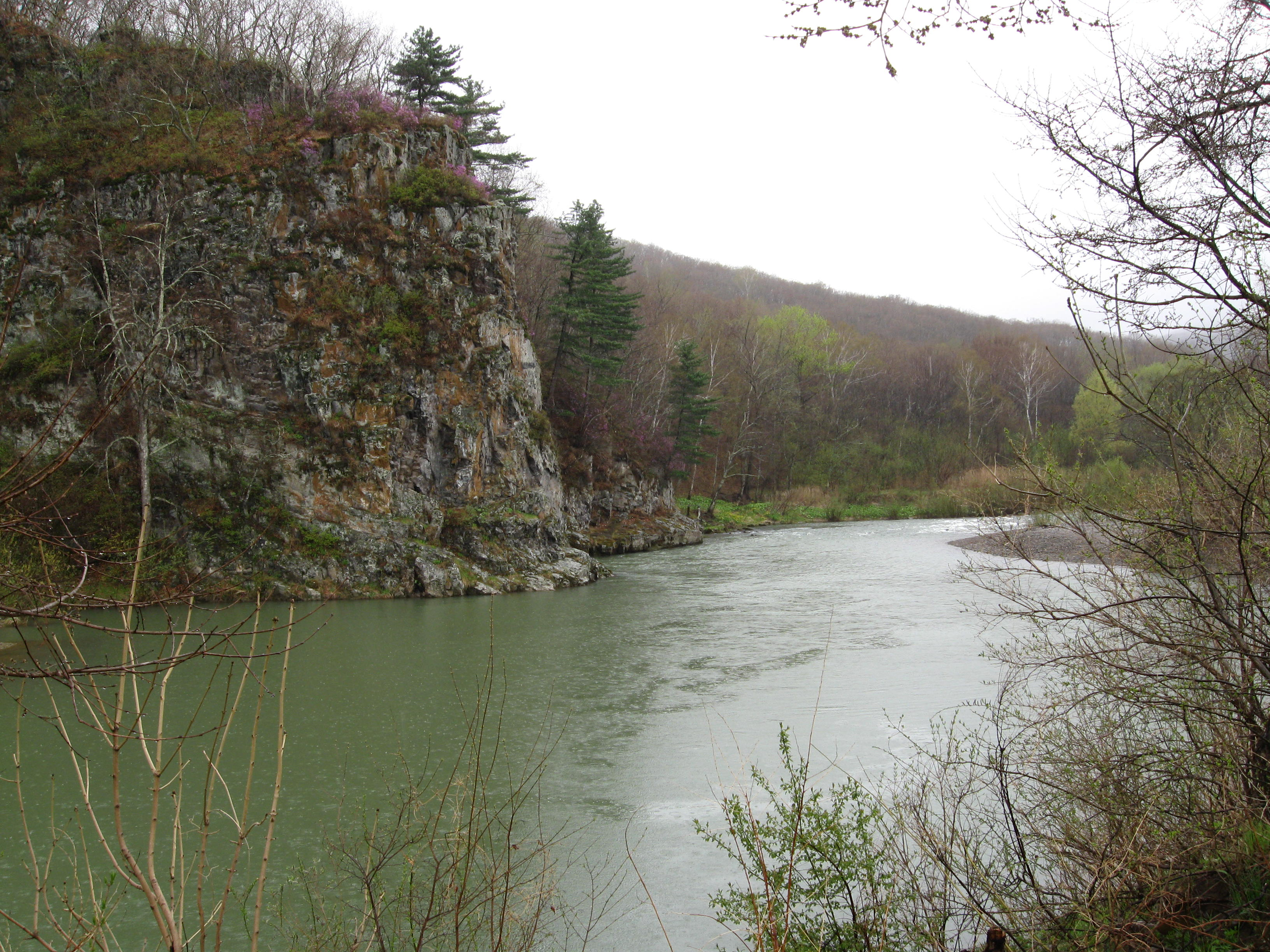

Location
- Country: Russia

Physical characteristics
- Mouth: Partizanskaya
  - coordinates: 43.1676°N 133.2486°E
- Length: 53 km (33 mi)
- Basin size: 687 km^{2} (265 sq mi)

Basin features
- Progression: Partizanskaya→ Sea of Japan

The Tigrovaya (Russian: Тигровая, means: "Tiger's river", formerly Сица Sitsa) is a river in South part of Primorsky Krai, a right tributary of the Partizanskaya. Its length is 53 kilometres (33 mi), and its drainage basin covers 687 square kilometres (265 mi^{2}). The river rises in Livadiya Range (South Sikhote-Alin) and flows into the Partizanskaya.

A former name of the river is Sitsa or Xica, which means "western tributary" in Chinese. The name change occurred in 1972.
