= Afroclinocera =

Scientific classification
- Domain: Eukaryota
- Kingdom: Animalia
- Phylum: Arthropoda
- Class: Insecta
- Order: Diptera
- Family: Empididae
- Subfamily: Clinocerinae
- Genus: Afroclinocera; Sinclair, 1999

Type species
- Afroclinocera obesa Sinclair, 1999

Genus of flies

Afroclinocera is a genus of flies in the family Empididae.

== Species ==
- A. obesa Sinclair, 1999
- A. pecki Sinclair, 1999
