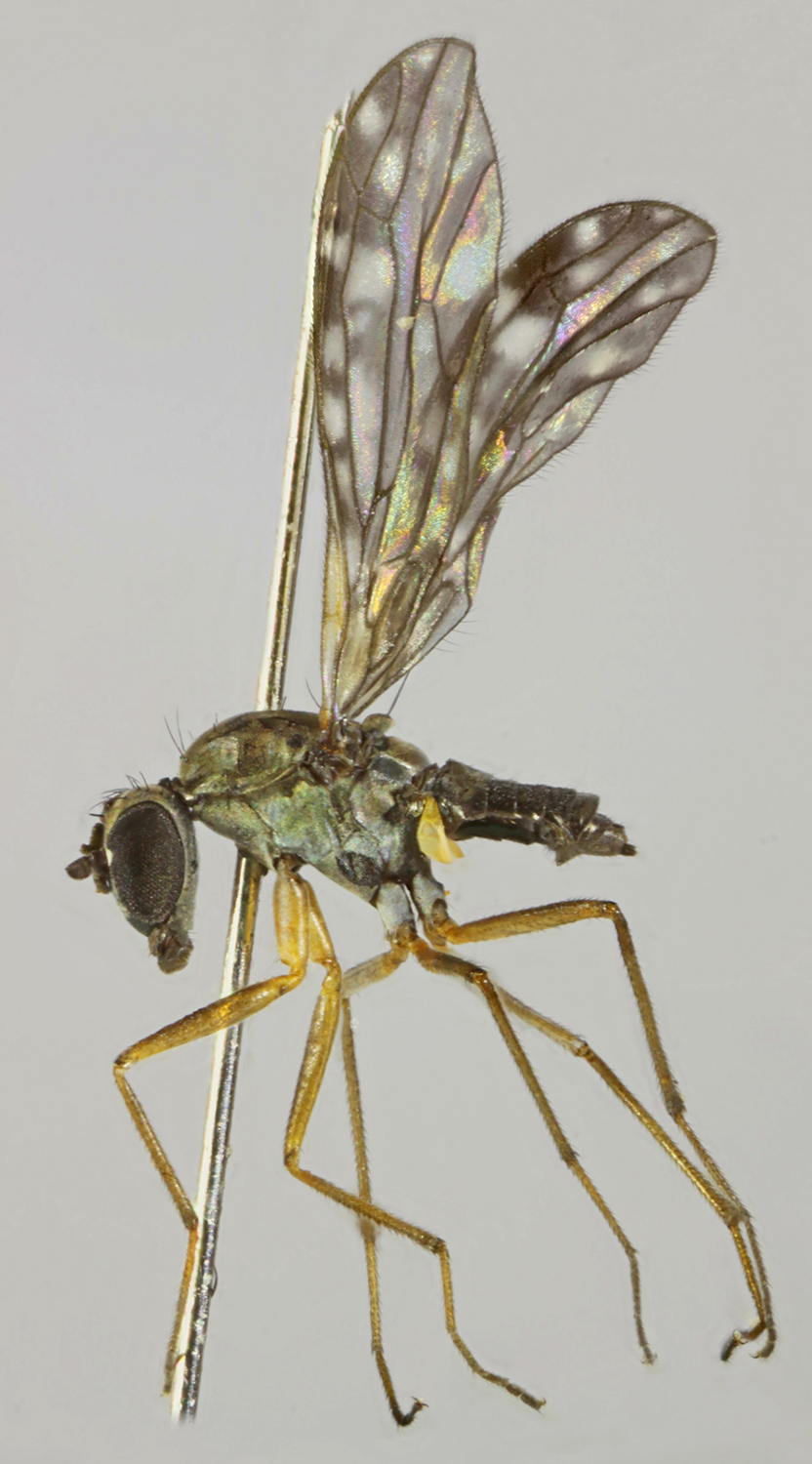
- Dolichocephala irrorata North Wales

Scientific classification
- Kingdom: Animalia
- Phylum: Arthropoda
- Class: Insecta
- Order: Diptera
- Family: Empididae
- Genus: Dolichocephala
- Species: D. irrorata

Binomial name
- Dolichocephala irrorata (Fallen, 1816)

= Dolichocephala irrorata =

Species of fly

Dolichocephala irrorata is a species of fly in the family Empididae. It is found in the Palearctic.

Dolichocephala irrorata in copula
