= Josef Mik =

Czech entomologist

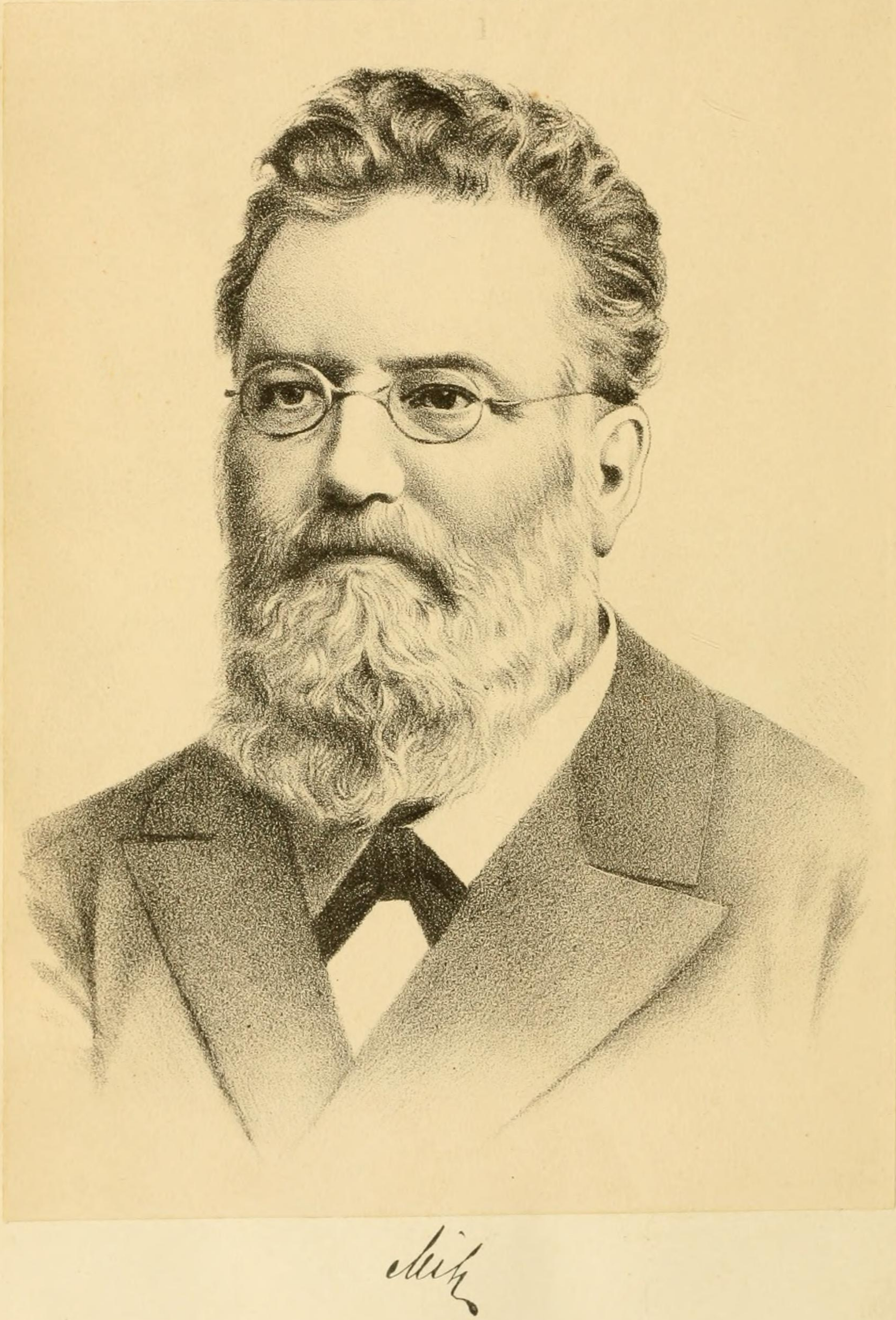
Josef Mik

Josef Mik, also Joseph Mik (23 March 1839 – 13 October 1900) was a Czech entomologist mainly interested in Diptera. He described many new species and made contributions to knowledge of the Diptera of Central Europe. Mik was the first dipterist to clarify the chaetotaxy of the legs.

"On the legs I distinguish a front [chaeta]- and a hind-side; an upper- and an under-side. When we imagine the leg stretched out horizontally and perpendicularly to the longitudinal axis of the body, the front-side is that which is turned towards the head, and the hind-sidethat turned towards the end of the body; the upper- and under-side, in such a case, are self-understood."

== Life ==
Mik was born in Zábřeh, Moravia. From 1871 to 1889, he was teacher at the Academic Gymnasium in Vienna. In 1889, he was given the Knight's Cross of the Order of Franz Joseph. He died in Vienna on 13 October 1900.

== Works ==
- 1866 Beitrag zur Dipterenfauna des österreichischen Küstenlandes. Abh. Zool.-Bot. Ges. Vienna 16:301-310.
- 1883 Dipterologische Bemerkungen I, II. Abh. Zool.-Bot. Ges. Vienna 33: 181-192.
- 1886 Dipterologische Miscellen, II, III, Vienna. Ent. Ztg. 5: 276-279, 317-318
- 1887 Dipterologische Miscellen. VI. Vienna. Ent. Ztg. 6: 238-242.
- 1891 Ueber die Dipterengattung Pachystylum Mcq. Vienna. Ent. Ztg. 10: 206-212.
- 1891 Vorläufige Notiz über Parathalassius blasigii, ein neues Dipteron aus Venedig. Vienna. Ent.Ztg. 10: 216-217.
- 1894 Dipterologische Miscellen (2. Serie). IV. Vienna. Ent. Ztg. 13:49-54.
- 1895 Dipterologische Miscellen (2. Series). VI. Vienna. Ent. Ztg. 14:93-98.
- 1895 With Friedrich (Fritz) Wachtl Commentar zu den Arbeiten von Hartig und Ratzeburg über Raupenfliegen (Tachiniden).Auf Grund einer Revision der Hartig’schen Tachiniden-Sammlung. Vienna. Ent. Ztg. 14:213-48.

Mik also made contributions to the field of botany.
