= Clinocerinae =

- Dolichocephala irrorata in copula

Scientific classification
- Kingdom: Animalia
- Phylum: Arthropoda
- Clade: Pancrustacea
- Class: Insecta
- Order: Diptera
- Family: Empididae
- Subfamily: Clinocerinae; Collin, 1928

Synonyms
- Clinoceratinae Melander, 1928

Subfamily of flies

Clinocerinae is a subfamily of flies belonging to the family Empididae.

== Genera ==
- Afroclinocera Sinclair, 1999
- Asymphyloptera Collin, 1933
- Bergenstammia Mik, 1881
- Clinocera Meigen, 1803
- Dolichocephala Macquart, 1823
- Hypenella Collin, 1941
- Kowarzia Mik, 1881
- Oreothalia Melander, 1902
- Phaeobalia Mik, 1881
- Proagomyia Collin, 1933
- Proclinopyga Melander, 1928
- Rhyacodromia Saigusa, 1986
- Roederiodes Coquillett, 1901
- Trichoclinocera Collin, 1941
- Wiedemannia Zetterstedt, 1838
