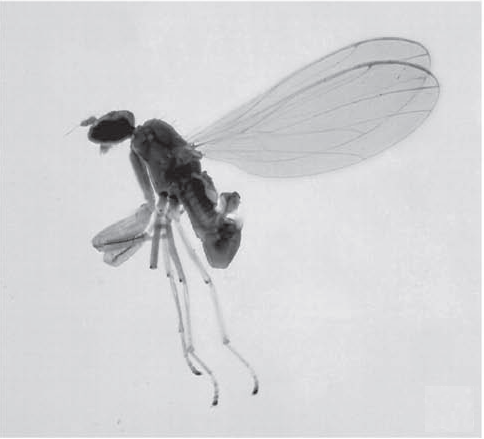
- Image of Anaclastoctedon lek

Scientific classification
- Kingdom: Animalia
- Phylum: Arthropoda
- Clade: Pancrustacea
- Class: Insecta
- Order: Diptera
- Family: Empididae
- Subfamily: Hemerodromiinae
- Tribe: Chelipodini
- Genus: Anaclastoctedon; Plant, 2010

Species
- Anaclastoctedon ancistrodes Plant, 2010; Anaclastoctedon antarai Plant, 2010; Anaclastoctedon lek Plant, 2010; Anaclastoctedon prionton Plant, 2010; Anaclastoctedon sano Plant, 2010

= Anaclastoctedon =

Genus of flies

Anaclastoctedon is a genus of dance flies in the family Empididae and the tribe Chelipodini. It includes five species found across Asia and Australia, with most species inhabiting Asia. The genus was described in 2010 based on specimens collected by the TIGER (Thailand Insect Group for Entomological Research), which sampled terrestrial invertebrates in 30 national parks in Thailand between 2006 and 2008. Similar to the genera Chelipoda and Achelipoda (also in the Chelipodini tribe), Anaclastoctedon is primarily distinguished by features of its postpedicel, wings, and male genitalia.

== Taxonomy ==
Five species of Anaclastoctedon have been described. A. ancistrodes, A. antarai, and A. lek are found in Thailand, Nepal, and Vietnam, respectively, while A. prionton and A. sano are found in Australia. Scientists have also proposed three additional possible species within the genus; however, they were not officially described due to the lack of male specimens.

- Anaclastoctedon ancistrodes Plant, 2010
- Anaclastoctedon antarai Plant, 2010
- Anaclastoctedon lek Plant, 2010
- Anaclastoctedon prionton Plant, 2010
- Anaclastoctedon sano Plant, 2010

== Etymology ==
The name Anaclastoctedon is derived from the Greek word anaclastos, meaning "reflexed," and ctedon, meaning "comb." Together, these refer to the "reflexed comb"-like front legs of insects in this genus, an adaptation used for hunting.

== Description ==
Species in the Anaclastoctedon genus range from 1.6–2.8 mm in size. Generally, Asian species are smaller than Australian species. Their postpedicels have three parts: the scapus, the pedicel, and the flagellum. The postpedicel is shorter and rounder than the postpedicels of other genera in the tribe Chelipodini. While the stylus is at least four times larger than the postpedicel, it lacks a basal segment.

The yellow veins in the wings do not bifurcate like those in most insects. Instead, the veins are linear, with long branches that outline the wing. Furthermore, while most flies have a basal medial cell in the middle of their wing, it is missing in Anaclastoctedon. This is similar to the genus Chelifera but is different from the genus Hemerodromia. The basal medial cell and basal radial cell are two cells in the Anaclastoctedon's wing, with the basal radial cell being longer than the basal medial cell. The wing membranes are nearly clear.

Their raptorial forelegs are primarily used for hunting and are widely separated. The front femur has two rows of setae and denticles (small tooth-like projections) on the ventral side. The front tibia has corresponding features that interlock with the front femur to catch prey.

A key feature of Anaclastoctedon is that the male terminalia are strongly reflexed and anteriorly positioned, unlike the terminalia of Hemerodromiinae. They are similar to the terminalia of Chelipodini, which inspired the genus name. Additionally, the epandrium and hypandrium are not fused, which is uncommon in the family. The cerci are paired appendages used to grasp the female genitalia during mating. In Anaclastoctedon, each cercus has two lobes. The upper lobe is large, curves upward, and is spade-like, while the lower lobe is smaller and pointed.

== Distribution ==
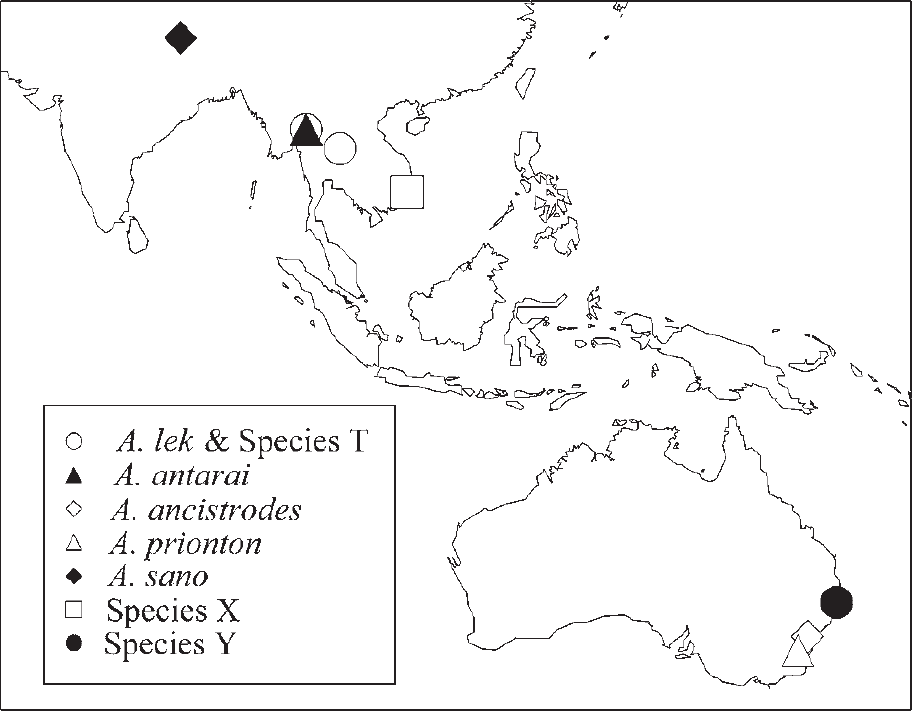
Distribution of Anaclastoctedon

The genus can be found across Southeast Asia and Southeastern Australia, mainly occupying montane forest habitats. In Asia, Anaclastoctedon has been identified in Thailand, Nepal, and Vietnam, where species were typically found in moist montane forest habitats. In Australia, they are also found in montane habitats, specifically in the dry sclerophyll woodlands of the Bassian.

== Distribution theories ==
Its distribution and phylogenetic traits suggest that it represents a southern temperate lineage that underwent northward migrated into Asia during the tertiary.

Anaclastoctedon is particularly associated with montane, moist forest habitats, where it persists in high-elevation, seasonal environments. According to the Climate History Model proposed by Plant, Anaclastoctedon and similar taxa were forced to migrate upward into moist montane refugia during periods of increasing lowland aridity, especially during glacial maxima. Those that could not adapt to seasonally dry conditions in the lowlands tracked moisture up into mountain zones, where they underwent speciation and endemism due to geographic and ecological isolation.

There is further evidence that ongoing orogenesis in Thailand contributed to this process by creating new, isolated highland habitats. These montane "islands" became centers of diversification, enabling genera like Anaclastoctedon to persist and evolve away from competition in the lowlands. The species’ presence in mountain arcs linking Thailand with the eastern Himalaya supports the idea of elevational corridors facilitating historical northward dispersal from an Australasian origin.
