= List of Hemerodromia species =

This is a list of 174 species in Hemerodromia, a genus of dance flies in the family Empididae.

== Hemerodromia species ==
- Hemerodromia acuminata Collin, 1941^{c g}
- Hemerodromia acutata Grootaert, Yang & Saigusa, 2000^{c g}
- Hemerodromia adulatoria Collin, 1927^{c g}
- Hemerodromia albicornis Meigen, 1822^{c g}
- Hemerodromia alida Smith, 1969^{c g}
- Hemerodromia alphalutea ^{g}
- Hemerodromia amazonensis ^{g}
- Hemerodromia anisoserrata ^{g}
- Hemerodromia anomala ^{g}
- Hemerodromia apicalis Smith, 1969^{c g}
- Hemerodromia apiciserrata Grootaert, Yang & Saigusa, 2000^{c g}
- Hemerodromia attenuata ^{g}
- Hemerodromia baetica Collin, 1927^{c g}
- Hemerodromia basalis Smith, 1969^{c g}
- Hemerodromia beatica Collin, 1927^{g}
- Hemerodromia beijingensis Yang & Yang, 1988^{c g}
- Hemerodromia betalutea ^{g}
- Hemerodromia bethiana Vaillant & Gagneur, 1998^{c g}
- Hemerodromia bifurcata Collin, 1941^{c g}
- Hemerodromia brevicercata ^{g}
- Hemerodromia brevifrons Melander, 1947^{i c g}
- Hemerodromia breviradia ^{g}
- Hemerodromia brunnea Melander, 1927^{i c g}
- Hemerodromia burdicki MacDonald, 1998^{c g}
- Hemerodromia captus Coquillett, 1895^{i c g}
- Hemerodromia carioca ^{g}
- Hemerodromia cataluna Strobl, 1909^{c g}
- Hemerodromia cercusdilatata ^{g}
- Hemerodromia chelata MacDonald, 1998^{c g}
- Hemerodromia chillcotti Harper, 1974^{i c g}
- Hemerodromia chita Smith, 1965^{c g}
- Hemerodromia chitaoides Wagner, Leese & Panesar, 2004^{c g}
- Hemerodromia choulyana Vaillant & Gagneur, 1998^{c g}
- Hemerodromia claripennis Frey, 1958^{c g}
- Hemerodromia coleophora Melander, 1927^{i c g}
- Hemerodromia collini ^{g}
- Hemerodromia concava Yang & Yang, 1988^{c g}
- Hemerodromia concinna Smith, 1969^{c g}
- Hemerodromia conspecta ^{g}
- Hemerodromia cornuhypandrialis ^{g}
- Hemerodromia cummingi ^{g}
- Hemerodromia curvata Grootaert, Yang & Saigusa, 2000^{c g}
- Hemerodromia defessa Williston, 1893
- Hemerodromia deltalutea ^{g}
- Hemerodromia deminuta ^{g}
- Hemerodromia demissa ^{g}
- Hemerodromia denticulata Wagner & Andersen, 1995^{c g}
- Hemerodromia digitata Grootaert, Yang & Saigusa, 2000^{c g}
- Hemerodromia dorsalis (Brunetti, 1913)^{c g}
- Hemerodromia dorsata (Melander, 1928)^{c g}
- Hemerodromia dromodromoa Plant & Sinclair, 2008^{c g}
- Hemerodromia duce Jones, 1940^{c g}
- Hemerodromia elongata Yang & Yang, 1995^{c g}
- Hemerodromia elongatiodes Wagner, Leese & Panesar, 2004^{c g}
- Hemerodromia empiformis (Say, 1823)^{i c g}
- Hemerodromia epandriocurvialis ^{g}
- Hemerodromia epsilutea ^{g}
- Hemerodromia etalutea ^{g}
- Hemerodromia euneura Yang, 1991^{c g}
- Hemerodromia exhibitor Melander, 1947^{i c g}
- Hemerodromia fibrina Landry, 1985^{i c g}
- Hemerodromia flaviventris Yang, 1991^{c g}
- Hemerodromia flexiformis MacDonald, 1998^{c g}
- Hemerodromia furcata Grootaert, Yang & Saigusa, 2000^{c g}
- Hemerodromia fusca Yang & Yang^{g}
- Hemerodromia gaditana Wagner & Cobo, 2001^{c g}
- Hemerodromia gagneuri Vaillant, 1981^{c g}
- Hemerodromia gammalutea ^{g}
- Hemerodromia gereckei Wagner, 1995^{c g}
- Hemerodromia glabella MacDonald, 1998^{c g}
- Hemerodromia gogi Smith, 1969^{c g}
- Hemerodromia gonatopus Speiser, 1908^{c g}
- Hemerodromia goya Jones, 1940^{c g}
- Hemerodromia guangxiensis Yang, 1991^{c g}
- Hemerodromia hammanica Vaillant & Moubayed, 1998^{c g}
- Hemerodromia haruspex Melander, 1947^{i c g}
- Hemerodromia hermelina Vaillant & Moubayed, 1998^{c g}
- Hemerodromia icenae Jones, 1940^{c g}
- Hemerodromia illiesi Joost, 1980^{c g}
- Hemerodromia iqasoa Plant & Sinclair, 2008^{c g}
- Hemerodromia isochita ^{g}
- Hemerodromia isserana Vaillant & Gagneur, 1998^{c g}
- Hemerodromia jauensis ^{g}
- Hemerodromia joosti Wagner, 1984^{c g}
- Hemerodromia jugulator Melander, 1927^{i c g}
- Hemerodromia kumia Plant & Sinclair, 2008^{c g}
- Hemerodromia lamellata ^{g}
- Hemerodromia lativitta Smith, 1969^{c g}
- Hemerodromia laudatoria Collin, 1927^{c g}
- Hemerodromia ligata MacDonald, 1998^{c g}
- Hemerodromia loba MacDonald, 1998^{c g}
- Hemerodromia lomri Smith, 1965^{c g}
- Hemerodromia longilamellata ^{g}
- Hemerodromia macrocephala Vaillant & Gagneur, 1998^{c g}
- Hemerodromia maculata Vaillant, 1968^{c g}
- Hemerodromia magogi Smith, 1969^{c g}
- Hemerodromia maia Jones, 1940^{c g}
- Hemerodromia maturaca ^{g}
- Hemerodromia mazoviensis Niesiolowski, 1987^{c g}
- Hemerodromia megalamellata ^{g}
- Hemerodromia melangyna Collin, 1927^{c g}
- Hemerodromia melanosoma Melander, 1947^{i c g}
- Hemerodromia membranosa ^{g}
- Hemerodromia menghaiensis Yang & Yang, 1988^{c g}
- Hemerodromia menglunana Grootaert, Yang & Saigusa, 2000^{c g}
- Hemerodromia moqimoqilia Plant & Sinclair, 2008^{c g}
- Hemerodromia mourai ^{g}
- Hemerodromia namtokhinpoon ^{g}
- Hemerodromia nigrescens Yang & Yang, 1995^{c g}
- Hemerodromia nigrolineata Roser, 1840^{c g}
- Hemerodromia nympha Melander, 1928^{c g}
- Hemerodromia ocellata ^{g}
- Hemerodromia oratoria Fallen, 1816^{c g}
- Hemerodromia oriens ^{g}
- Hemerodromia orientalis Meijere, 1911^{c g}
- Hemerodromia phahompokensis ^{g}
- Hemerodromia pila Smith, 1965^{c g}
- Hemerodromia portia Jones, 1940^{c g}
- Hemerodromia puerensis Yang & Yang, 1988^{c g}
- Hemerodromia radialis Collin, 1928^{c g}
- Hemerodromia raptoria Meigen, 1830^{c g}
- Hemerodromia raradamua Plant & Sinclair, 2008^{c g}
- Hemerodromia reclinata MacDonald, 1998^{c g}
- Hemerodromia resurrecta Jones, 1940^{c g}
- Hemerodromia rhomboides Wagner, Leese & Panesar, 2004^{c g}
- Hemerodromia rogatoris Coquillett, 1895^{i c g}
- Hemerodromia seguyi ^{i c g}
- Hemerodromia senivaua Plant & Sinclair, 2008^{c g}
- Hemerodromia serpa Smith, 1965^{c g}
- Hemerodromia serrata Saigusa & Yang, 2003^{c g}
- Hemerodromia simplicinervis Melander, 1928^{c g}
- Hemerodromia sinclairi MacDonald, 1998^{c g}
- Hemerodromia slovenica Horvat & Wagner, 1990^{c g}
- Hemerodromia smithi ^{g}
- Hemerodromia songsee ^{g}
- Hemerodromia spectabilis Smith, 1969^{c g}
- Hemerodromia spiculata Plant & Sinclair, 2008^{c g}
- Hemerodromia spinosa Vaillant & Gagneur, 1998^{c g}
- Hemerodromia splendens Smith, 1969^{c g}
- Hemerodromia stellaris Melander, 1947^{i c g}
- Hemerodromia striata Yang & Yang, 1988^{c g}
- Hemerodromia subapicalis Yang, Zhang & Zhang, 2007^{c g}
- Hemerodromia subchelata MacDonald, 1998^{c g}
- Hemerodromia subiqasoa Plant & Sinclair, 2008^{c g}
- Hemerodromia subspinosa Yang, Zhang & Zhang, 2007^{c g}
- Hemerodromia sufflexa Melander, 1947^{i c g}
- Hemerodromia superstitiosa Say, 1824^{i c g b}
- Hemerodromia susana Jones, 1940^{c g}
- Hemerodromia systoechon ^{g}
- Hemerodromia tarda Jones, 1940^{c g}
- Hemerodromia tebbarana Vaillant & Gagneur, 1998^{c g}
- Hemerodromia telloutica Vaillant & Gagneur, 1998^{c g}
- Hemerodromia tigrigrana Vaillant & Gagneur, 1998^{c g}
- Hemerodromia todrhana (Vaillant, 1956)^{c g}
- Hemerodromia ubajaraensis ^{g}
- Hemerodromia ultima Jones, 1940^{c g}
- Hemerodromia unilineata Zetterstedt, 1842^{c g}
- Hemerodromia ursula Jones, 1940^{c g}
- Hemerodromia vates Melander, 1947^{i c g}
- Hemerodromia vittata Loew, 1862^{i c g}
- Hemerodromia votovotoa Plant & Sinclair, 2008^{c g}
- Hemerodromia vucea Plant & Sinclair, 2008^{c g}
- Hemerodromia vulacia Plant & Sinclair, 2008^{c g}
- Hemerodromia vutivutia Plant & Sinclair, 2008^{c g}
- Hemerodromia wagneri Cobo & Carreira, 2003^{c g}
- Hemerodromia watlingi Plant & Sinclair, 2008^{c g}
- Hemerodromia xanthiocephala Yang, 1991^{c g}
- Hemerodromia xanthocephala Yang & Yang, 1991^{c g}
- Hemerodromia xiphias Bezzi, 1914^{c g}
- Hemerodromia xizangensis Yang, 1991^{c g}
- Hemerodromia yunnanensis Yang & Yang, 1988^{c g}
- Hemerodromia zarcana Vaillant & Moubayed, 1998^{c g}
- Hemerodromia zetalutea ^{g}
- Hemerodromia zwicki Horvat, 1993^{c g}

Data sources: i = ITIS, c = Catalogue of Life, g = GBIF, b = Bugguide.net
