= Drymodromia plurabella =

Scientific classification
- Kingdom: Animalia
- Phylum: Arthropoda
- Class: Insecta
- Order: Diptera
- Infraorder: Asilomorpha
- Superfamily: Empidoidea
- Family: Empididae
- Subfamily: Hemerodromiinae
- Genus: Drymodromia
- Species: D. plurabella

Binomial name
- Drymodromia plurabella Garrett-Jones, 1940

Species of fly

Drymodromia plurabella is a species of dance flies, in the fly family Empididae.
