= Afrodromia longicornis =

Scientific classification
- Kingdom: Animalia
- Phylum: Arthropoda
- Class: Insecta
- Order: Diptera
- Infraorder: Asilomorpha
- Superfamily: Empidoidea
- Family: Empididae
- Subfamily: Hemerodromiinae
- Genus: Afrodromia
- Species: A. longicornis

Binomial name
- Afrodromia longicornis Smith, 1969

Species of fly

Afrodromia longicornis is a species of dance flies, in the fly family Empididae.
