= Phyllodromia proiecta =

Scientific classification
- Kingdom: Animalia
- Phylum: Arthropoda
- Class: Insecta
- Order: Diptera
- Superfamily: Empidoidea
- Family: Empididae
- Subfamily: Hemerodromiinae
- Tribe: Chelipodini
- Genus: Phyllodromia
- Species: P. proiecta

Binomial name
- Phyllodromia proiecta Plant, 2005

Species of fly

Phyllodromia proiecta is a species of dance flies, in the fly family Empididae.
