= Monodromia =

Scientific classification
- Kingdom: Animalia
- Phylum: Arthropoda
- Class: Insecta
- Order: Diptera
- Infraorder: Asilomorpha
- Superfamily: Empidoidea
- Family: Empididae
- Subfamily: Hemerodromiinae
- Genus: Monodromia; Collin, 1928

Type species
- Monodromia fragilis Collin, 1928

Genus of flies

Monodromia is a genus of flies in the family Empididae.

== Species ==
- M. fragilis Collin, 1928
