= Porphyrochroa xavieri =

Scientific classification
- Kingdom: Animalia
- Phylum: Arthropoda
- Class: Insecta
- Order: Diptera
- Infraorder: Asilomorpha
- Superfamily: Empidoidea
- Family: Empididae
- Subfamily: Empidinae
- Genus: Porphyrochroa
- Species: P. xavieri

Binomial name
- Porphyrochroa xavieri Mendonça, Rafael & Ale-Rocha, 2008

Species of fly

Porphyrochroa xavieri is a species of dance fly in the family Empididae.
