= Porphyrochroa vidali =

Scientific classification
- Kingdom: Animalia
- Phylum: Arthropoda
- Clade: Pancrustacea
- Class: Insecta
- Order: Diptera
- Infraorder: Asilomorpha
- Superfamily: Empidoidea
- Family: Empididae
- Subfamily: Empidinae
- Genus: Porphyrochroa
- Species: P. vidali

Binomial name
- Porphyrochroa vidali Mendonça, Rafael & Ale-Rocha, 2007

Species of fly

Porphyrochroa vidali is a species of dance fly in the family Empididae.
