= Ptilophyllodromia =

Scientific classification
- Kingdom: Animalia
- Phylum: Arthropoda
- Clade: Pancrustacea
- Class: Insecta
- Order: Diptera
- Infraorder: Asilomorpha
- Superfamily: Empidoidea
- Family: Empididae
- Subfamily: Hemerodromiinae
- Genus: Ptilophyllodromia; Bezzi, 1904

Type species
- Ptilophyllodromia biroi Bezzi, 1904

Genus of flies

Ptilophyllodromia is a genus of flies in the family Empididae.

== Species ==
- P. biroi Bezzi, 1904
