= Porphyrochroa palliata =

Scientific classification
- Kingdom: Animalia
- Phylum: Arthropoda
- Clade: Pancrustacea
- Class: Insecta
- Order: Diptera
- Infraorder: Asilomorpha
- Superfamily: Empidoidea
- Family: Empididae
- Subfamily: Empidinae
- Genus: Porphyrochroa
- Species: P. palliata

Binomial name
- Porphyrochroa palliata (Coquillett, 1902)

Synonyms
- Sciodromia palliatus Coquillett, 1902

Species of fly

Porphyrochroa palliata is a species of dance flies, in the fly family Empididae.
