= Neoplasta basalis =

Scientific classification
- Kingdom: Animalia
- Phylum: Arthropoda
- Class: Insecta
- Order: Diptera
- Superfamily: Empidoidea
- Family: Empididae
- Subfamily: Hemerodromiinae
- Genus: Neoplasta
- Species: N. basalis

Binomial name
- Neoplasta basalis Collin, 1933

Species of fly

Neoplasta basalis is a species of dance flies, in the fly family Empididae.
