= Porphyrochroa argentata =

Scientific classification
- Kingdom: Animalia
- Phylum: Arthropoda
- Clade: Pancrustacea
- Class: Insecta
- Order: Diptera
- Infraorder: Asilomorpha
- Superfamily: Empidoidea
- Family: Empididae
- Subfamily: Empidinae
- Genus: Porphyrochroa
- Species: P. argentata

Binomial name
- Porphyrochroa argentata Rafael & Ale-Rocha, 2002

Species of fly

Porphyrochroa argentata is a species of dance flies, in the fly family Empididae.

It was recorded for the first time in the Dominican Republic.
