= Phyllodromia americana =

Scientific classification
- Domain: Eukaryota
- Kingdom: Animalia
- Phylum: Arthropoda
- Class: Insecta
- Order: Diptera
- Superfamily: Empidoidea
- Family: Empididae
- Subfamily: Hemerodromiinae
- Tribe: Chelipodini
- Genus: Phyllodromia
- Species: P. americana

Binomial name
- Phyllodromia americana Melander, 1947

Species of fly

Phyllodromia americana is a species of dance flies in the family Empididae.
