= Neoplasta discreta =

Scientific classification
- Kingdom: Animalia
- Phylum: Arthropoda
- Class: Insecta
- Order: Diptera
- Superfamily: Empidoidea
- Family: Empididae
- Subfamily: Hemerodromiinae
- Genus: Neoplasta
- Species: N. discreta

Binomial name
- Neoplasta discreta Collin, 1933

Species of fly

Neoplasta discreta is a species of dance flies, in the fly family Empididae.
