= Neoplasta brevicornis =

Scientific classification
- Kingdom: Animalia
- Phylum: Arthropoda
- Class: Insecta
- Order: Diptera
- Superfamily: Empidoidea
- Family: Empididae
- Subfamily: Hemerodromiinae
- Genus: Neoplasta
- Species: N. brevicornis

Binomial name
- Neoplasta brevicornis Collin, 1933

Species of fly

Neoplasta brevicornis is a species of dance flies, in the fly family Empididae.
