= Raptorial =

Arthropod leg capable of grasping prey

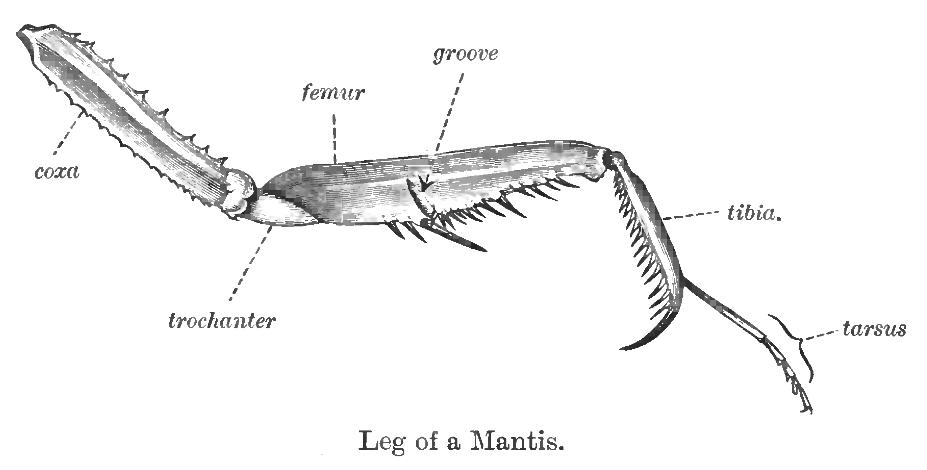
The raptorial foreleg of a praying mantis

In biology (specifically the anatomy of arthropods), the term raptorial implies much the same as predatory but most often refers to modifications of an arthropod's appendages that make it function for the rapid grasping of prey before it is consumed.

Raptorial appendages formed under the basis of a structure known as subchela, although not all subchelate limbs are necessarily to be raptorial. it is formed by the opposing faces of two successive podomeres (segments), as the distal podomere fold back towards the previous podomere, two gripping surfaces open and close in a jackknife-like fashion. It is distinct from the chela (pincer-like) as seen in crabs and scorpions, where the previous podomere has a terminal, similarly claw-like protrusion to interact with the distal podomere, although intermediate forms between chelate and subchelate limbs may occur.

Raptorial forelegs convergently evolved at least 7 times within insect lineages, where in all cases the femur and tibia (third and fourth podomere) became the grasping apparatus. The most iconic example is mantis, others including Mantispidae (mantidfly lacewing), some nepomorph waterbugs (giant waterbug, water scorpion), Emesinae (thread-legged bug), Phymatinae (ambush bug), Ochthera shore fly and some dagger flies (Chelifera, Chelipoda). In most cases, the evolution of raptorial frontlegs co-occurred with other modifications such as elongated prothorax and large compound eyes, which are advantageous for prey detection and capture as well.

Raptorial appendages also can be found in other arthropods. One notable example from crustaceans is the ballistic second maxilliped of spearing mantis shrimp. A few arachnid lineages such as Amblypygi and many laniatorid harvestmans also have raptorial pedipalps.

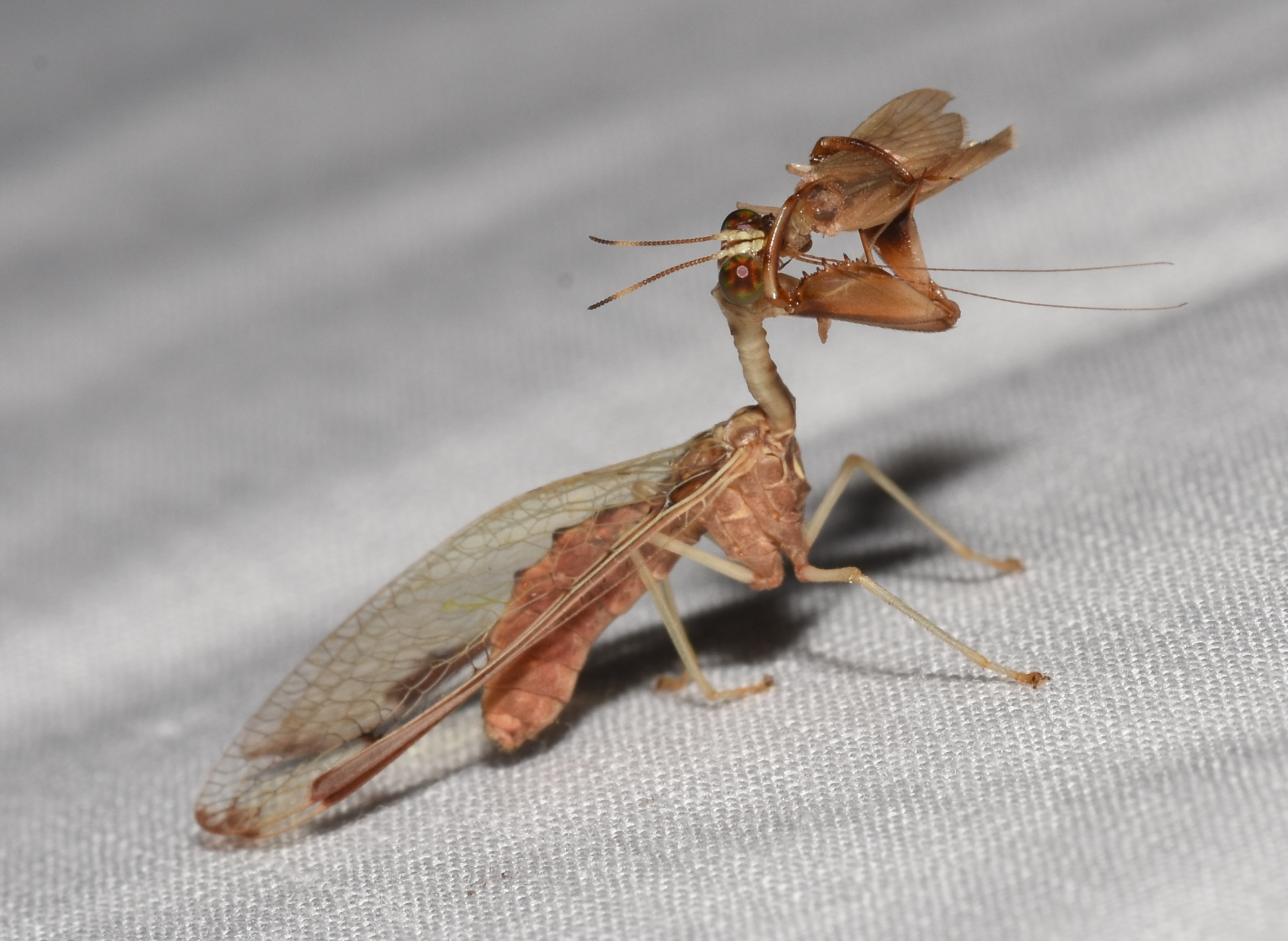
Mantispid lacewing, holding a prey with its raptorial forelegs

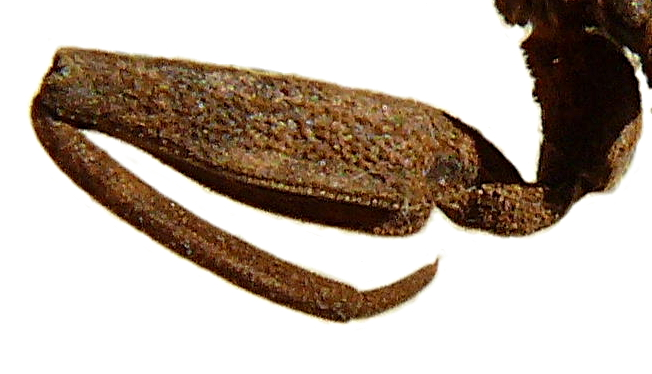
raptorial foreleg of water scorpion

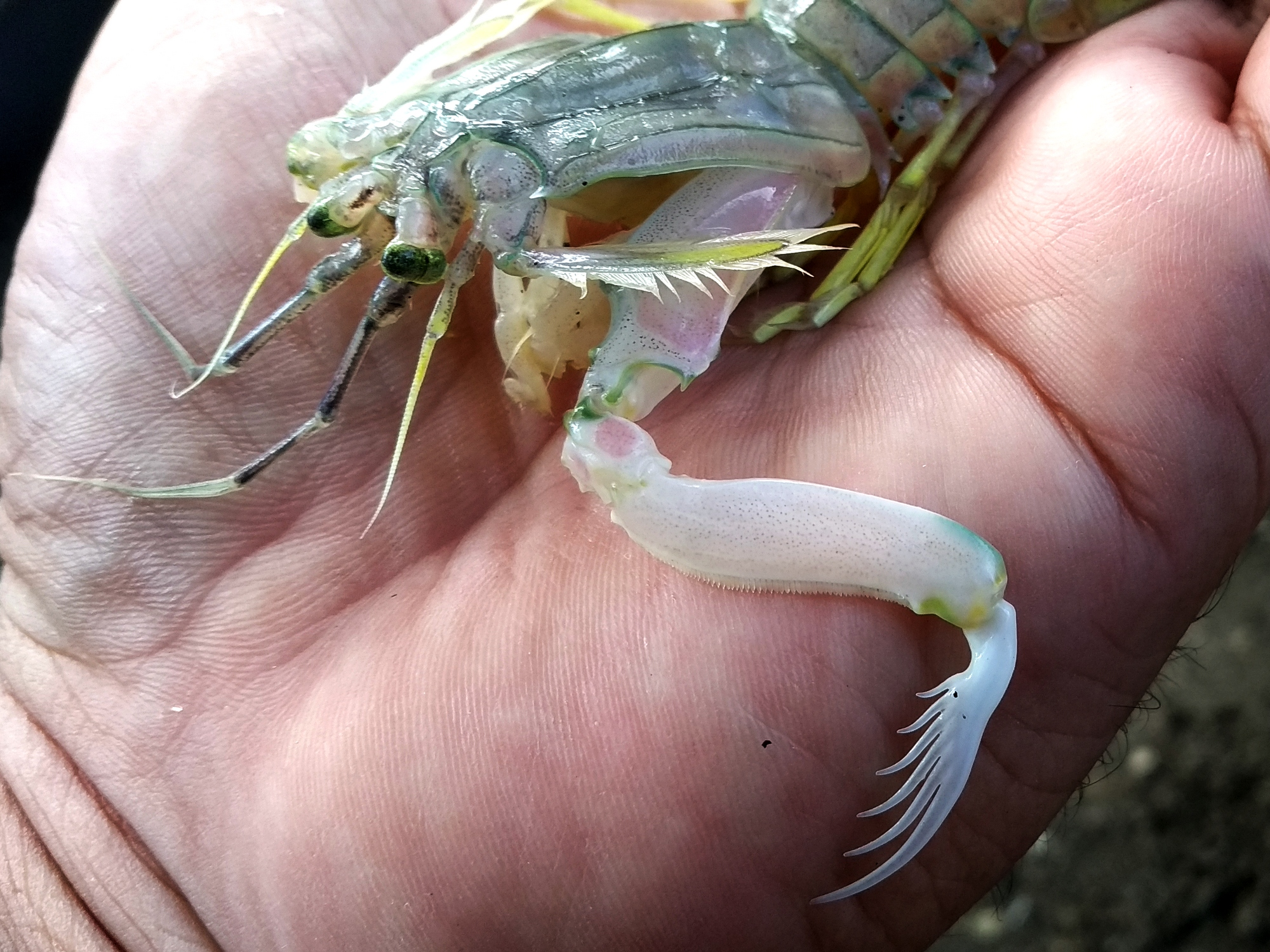
Spearer-type maxilliped of a mantis shrimp

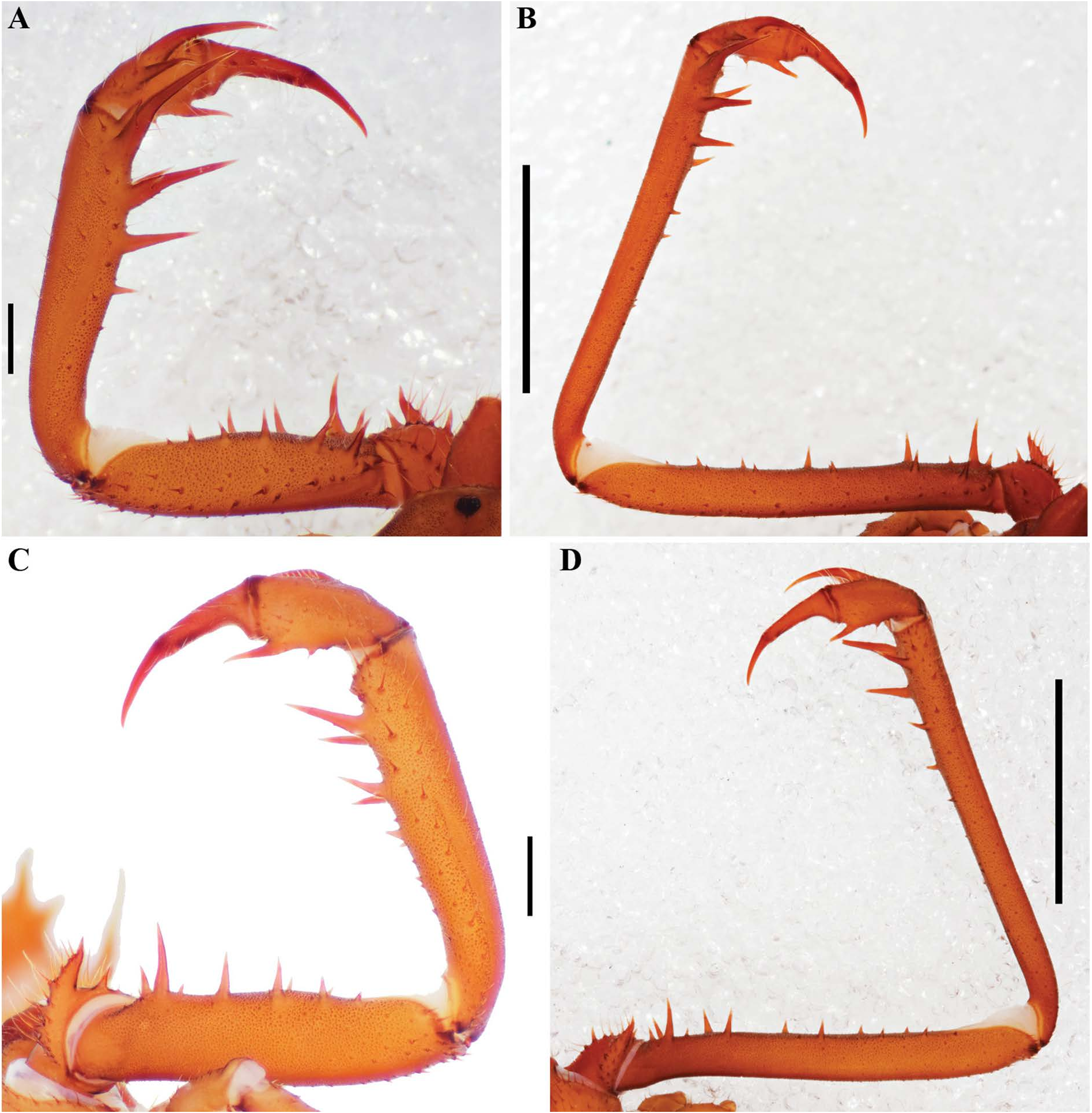
amblypygid pedipalps
