= Doliodromia =

Scientific classification
- Domain: Eukaryota
- Kingdom: Animalia
- Phylum: Arthropoda
- Class: Insecta
- Order: Diptera
- Family: Empididae
- Subfamily: Hemerodromiinae
- Genus: Doliodromia; Collin, 1928

Type species
- Doliodromia avita Collin, 1928

Genus of flies

Doliodromia is a genus of flies in the family Empididae.

== Species ==
- D. avita Collin, 1928
