= Chelipodozus cinereus =

Scientific classification
- Kingdom: Animalia
- Phylum: Arthropoda
- Class: Insecta
- Order: Diptera
- Family: Empididae
- Genus: Chelipodozus
- Species: C. cinereus

Binomial name
- Chelipodozus cinereus Collin, 1933

Species of fly

Chelipodozus cinereus is a species of dance flies, in the fly family Empididae.
