= Drymodromia femorata =

Scientific classification
- Kingdom: Animalia
- Phylum: Arthropoda
- Class: Insecta
- Order: Diptera
- Family: Empididae
- Genus: Drymodromia
- Species: D. femorata

Binomial name
- Drymodromia femorata Smith, 1969

Species of fly

Clinorhampha femorata is a species of dance flies, in the fly family Empididae.
