= Chelipodozus =

Scientific classification
- Domain: Eukaryota
- Kingdom: Animalia
- Phylum: Arthropoda
- Class: Insecta
- Order: Diptera
- Family: Empididae
- Subfamily: Hemerodromiinae
- Genus: Chelipodozus; Collin, 1933

Type species
- Chelipodozus cinereus Collin, 1933

Genus of flies

Chelipodozus is a genus of flies in the family Empididae.

== Species ==
- C. araucariana Plant, 2008
- C. australis Plant, 2008
- C. chelipodiformis Plant, 2008
- C. chodlipang Plant, 2008
- C. cinereus Collin, 1933
- C. luteothorax Plant, 2008
- C. mapucheensis Plant, 2008
- C. ochraceus Collin, 1933
- C. trauco Plant, 2008
