= Dryodromya =

Scientific classification
- Domain: Eukaryota
- Kingdom: Animalia
- Phylum: Arthropoda
- Class: Insecta
- Order: Diptera
- Family: Empididae
- Subfamily: Hemerodromiinae
- Genus: Dryodromya; Rondani, 1856

Type species
- Dryodromya testacea Rondani, 1856

Synonyms
- Driodromyia Bezzi, 1903; Dryodromia Collin, 1961; Synamphotera Loew, 1858

Genus of flies

Dryodromya is a genus of flies in the family Empididae.

== Species ==
- D. testacea Rondani, 1856
