= Chelipodozus trauco =

Scientific classification
- Kingdom: Animalia
- Phylum: Arthropoda
- Clade: Pancrustacea
- Class: Insecta
- Order: Diptera
- Family: Empididae
- Genus: Chelipodozus
- Species: C. trauco

Binomial name
- Chelipodozus trauco Plant, 2008

Species of fly

Chelipodozus trauco is a species of dance flies, in the fly family Empididae.
