= Chelipodozus ochraceus =

Scientific classification
- Kingdom: Animalia
- Phylum: Arthropoda
- Class: Insecta
- Order: Diptera
- Family: Empididae
- Genus: Chelipodozus
- Species: C. ochraceus

Binomial name
- Chelipodozus ochraceus Collin, 1933

Species of fly

Chelipodozus ochraceus is a species of dance flies, in the fly family Empididae.
