= Colabris coxalis =

Scientific classification
- Kingdom: Animalia
- Phylum: Arthropoda
- Class: Insecta
- Order: Diptera
- Family: Empididae
- Genus: Colabris
- Species: C. coxalis

Binomial name
- Colabris coxalis Melander, 1928

Species of fly

Cladodromia coxalis is a species of dance flies, in the fly family Empididae.
