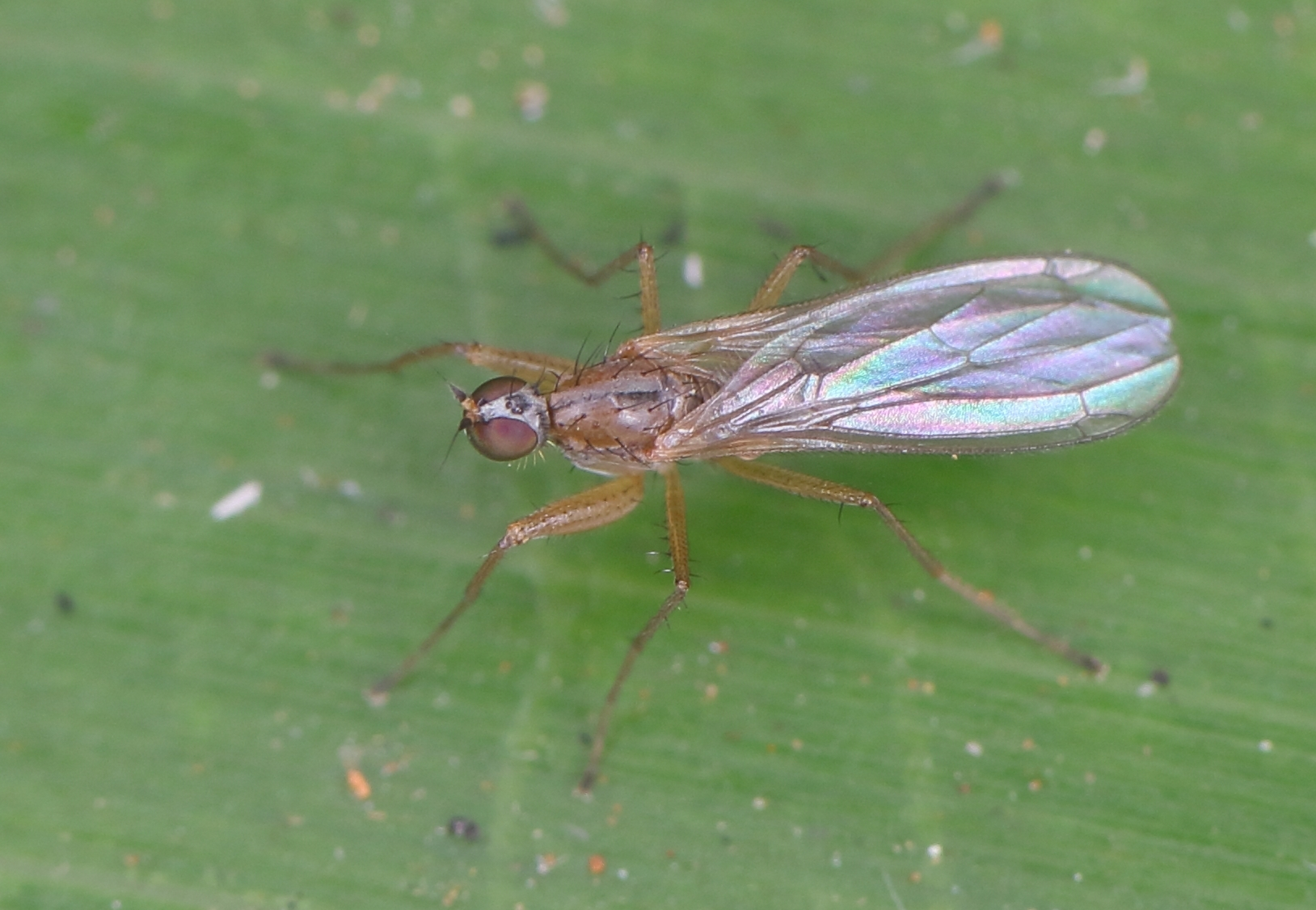

Scientific classification
- Kingdom: Animalia
- Phylum: Arthropoda
- Clade: Pancrustacea
- Class: Insecta
- Order: Diptera
- Superfamily: Empidoidea
- Family: Empididae
- Subfamily: Hemerodromiinae
- Genus: Afrodromia; Smith, 1969

Type species
- Afrodromia maculifemur Smith, 1969

= Afrodromia =

Genus of flies

Afrodromia is a genus of flies in the family Empididae.

== Species ==
The following species are recognised in the genus Afrodromia:

- A. angularis Smith, 1969
- A. bicolor Smith, 1969
- A. concolor Smith, 1969
- A. flavifemur Smith, 1969
- A. fulgida Smith, 1969
- A. genitalis Smith, 1969
- A. julianus Smith, 1969
- A. longicornis Smith, 1969
- A. maculifemur Smith, 1969
- A. montana Smith, 1969
- A. reducta Smith, 1969
- A. semperviva Smith, 1969
- A. sinuosa Smith, 1969
