= Neoplasta =

Scientific classification
- Domain: Eukaryota
- Kingdom: Animalia
- Phylum: Arthropoda
- Class: Insecta
- Order: Diptera
- Family: Empididae
- Subfamily: Hemerodromiinae
- Genus: Neoplasta; Coquillett, 1895

Type species
- Hemerodromia scapularis Loew, 1862

Genus of flies

Neoplasta is a genus of flies in the family Empididae.

== Species ==
- N. acuta Collin, 1933
- N. alleghani Melander, 1947
- N. analis Thomson, 1869
- N. basalis Collin, 1933
- N. bifida MacDonald & Turner, 1993
- N. bivittata Philippi, 1865
- N. brevicornis Collin, 1933
- N. chrysopleura MacDonald & Turner, 1993
- N. cilicauda Collin, 1933
- N. concava MacDonald & Turner, 1993
- N. coxalis Collin, 1933
- N. deyrupi MacDonald & Turner, 1993
- N. discreta Collin, 1933
- N. excavata Collin, 1933
- N. femoralis Bezzi, 1909
- N. fortiseta Smith, 1962
- N. fregapanii Rafael, 2001
- N. hansoni MacDonald & Turner, 1993
- N. hebes Melander, 1947
- N. megorchis Melander, 1947
- N. neblina Rafael, 2001
- N. octoterga MacDonald & Turner, 1993
- N. parahebes MacDonald & Turner, 1993
- N. paramegorchis MacDonald & Turner, 1993
- N. scapularis (Loew, 1862)
- N. scapuliformis MacDonald & Turner, 1993
