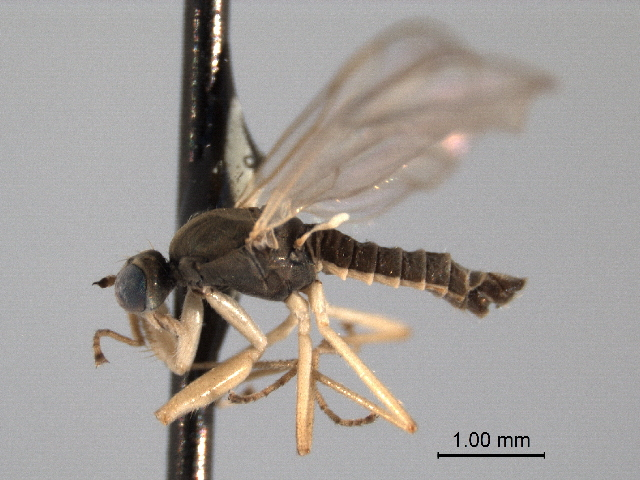
- Metachela albipes

Scientific classification
- Domain: Eukaryota
- Kingdom: Animalia
- Phylum: Arthropoda
- Class: Insecta
- Order: Diptera
- Family: Empididae
- Subfamily: Hemerodromiinae
- Genus: Metachela; Coquillett, 1903

Type species
- Hemerodromia collusor Melander, 1902

= Metachela =

Genus of flies

Metachela is a genus of flies in the family Empididae.

== Species ==
- M. albipes (Walker, 1849)
- M. collusor (Melander, 1902)
- M. convexa MacDonald, 1989
- M. nigriventris (Loew, 1864)
