= Hemerodromia superstitiosa =

Scientific classification
- Domain: Eukaryota
- Kingdom: Animalia
- Phylum: Arthropoda
- Class: Insecta
- Order: Diptera
- Family: Empididae
- Genus: Hemerodromia
- Species: H. superstitiosa

Binomial name
- Hemerodromia superstitiosa Say, 1824

Species of fly

Hemerodromia superstitiosa is a species of dance flies in the family Empididae.
