= Drymodromia =

Scientific classification
- Domain: Eukaryota
- Kingdom: Animalia
- Phylum: Arthropoda
- Class: Insecta
- Order: Diptera
- Family: Empididae
- Subfamily: Hemerodromiinae
- Genus: Drymodromia; Becker, 1914

Type species
- Drymodromia jeanneli Becker, 1914

Genus of flies

Drymodromia is a genus of flies in the family Empididae.

== Species ==
- D. beckeri Smith, 1969
- D. bimaculata Wagner & Andersen, 1995
- D. capensis Smith, 1969
- D. femorata Smith, 1969
- D. flaviventris Wagner & Andersen, 1995
- D. gahinga Garrett-Jones, 1940
- D. jeanneli Becker, 1914
- D. maculipennis Smith, 1969
- D. plurabella Garrett-Jones, 1940
- D. pseudofemorata Smith, 1969
- D. reducta Smith, 1969
- D. seticosta Garrett-Jones, 1940
- D. similis Smith, 1969
- D. simplex Smith, 1969
- D. trivittata Smith, 1969
- D. trochanterata Smith, 1969
