= Colabris =

Scientific classification
- Domain: Eukaryota
- Kingdom: Animalia
- Phylum: Arthropoda
- Class: Insecta
- Order: Diptera
- Family: Empididae
- Subfamily: Hemerodromiinae
- Genus: Colabris; Melander, 1928

Type species
- Colabris rufescens Melander, 1928

Genus of flies

Colabris is a genus of flies in the family Empididae.

== Species ==
- C. coxalis Melander, 1928
- C. rufescens Melander, 1928
