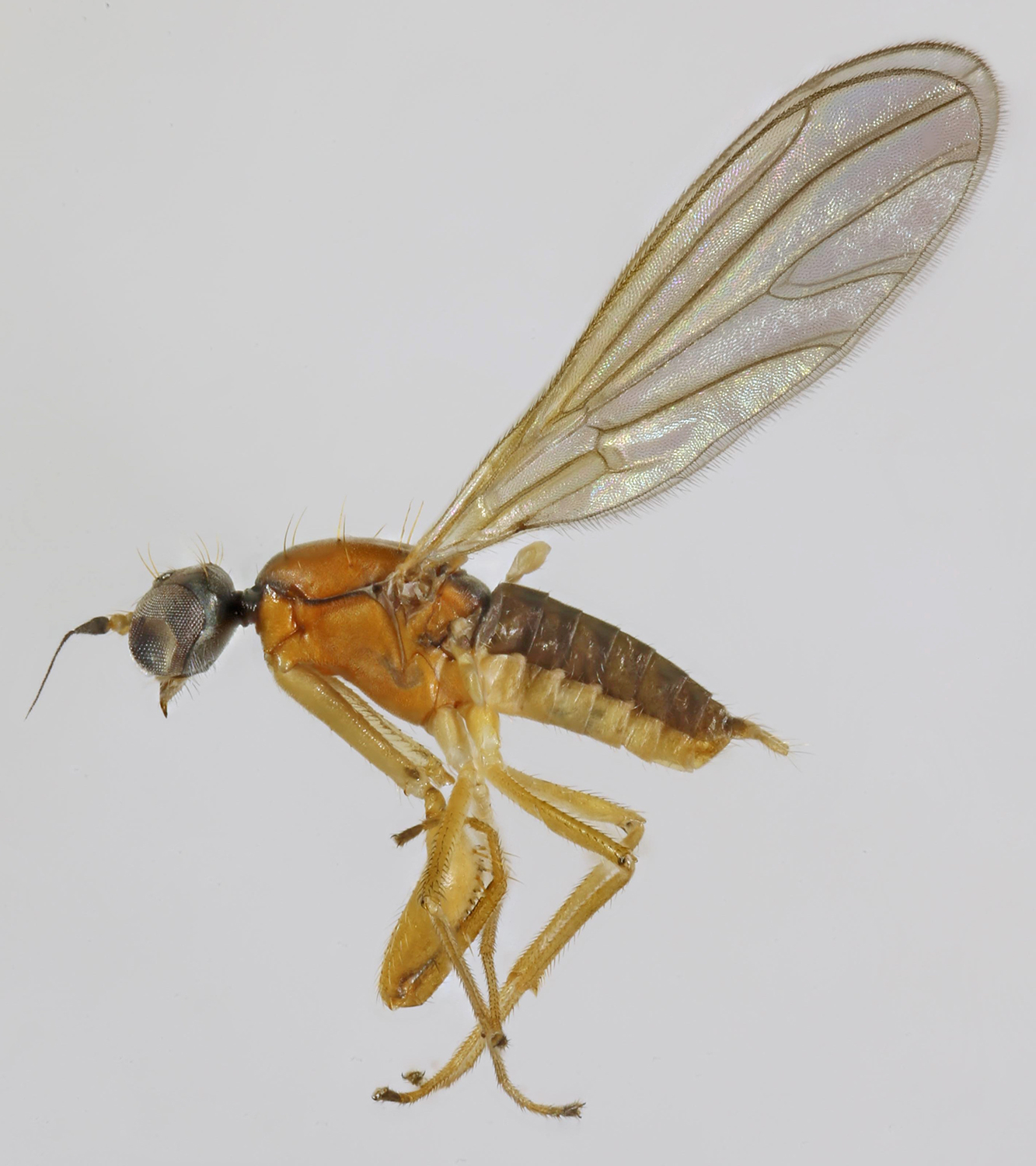
- Phyllodromia melanocephala North Wales

Scientific classification
- Kingdom: Animalia
- Phylum: Arthropoda
- Class: Insecta
- Order: Diptera
- Family: Empididae
- Genus: Phyllodromia
- Species: P. melanocephala

Binomial name
- Phyllodromia melanocephala (Fabricius, 1794)

Synonyms
- Empis melanocephala Fabricius, 1794; Hemerodromia obsecratoria Walker, 1837

= Phyllodromia melanocephala =

Species of fly

Phyllodromia melanocephala is a species of fly in the family Empididae. It is found in the Palearctic.
