= Chelipodozus chelipodiformis =

Scientific classification
- Kingdom: Animalia
- Phylum: Arthropoda
- Class: Insecta
- Order: Diptera
- Family: Empididae
- Genus: Chelipodozus
- Species: C. chelipodiformis

Binomial name
- Chelipodozus chelipodiformis Plant, 2008

Species of fly

Chelipodozus chelipodiformis is a species of dance flies, in the fly family Empididae.
