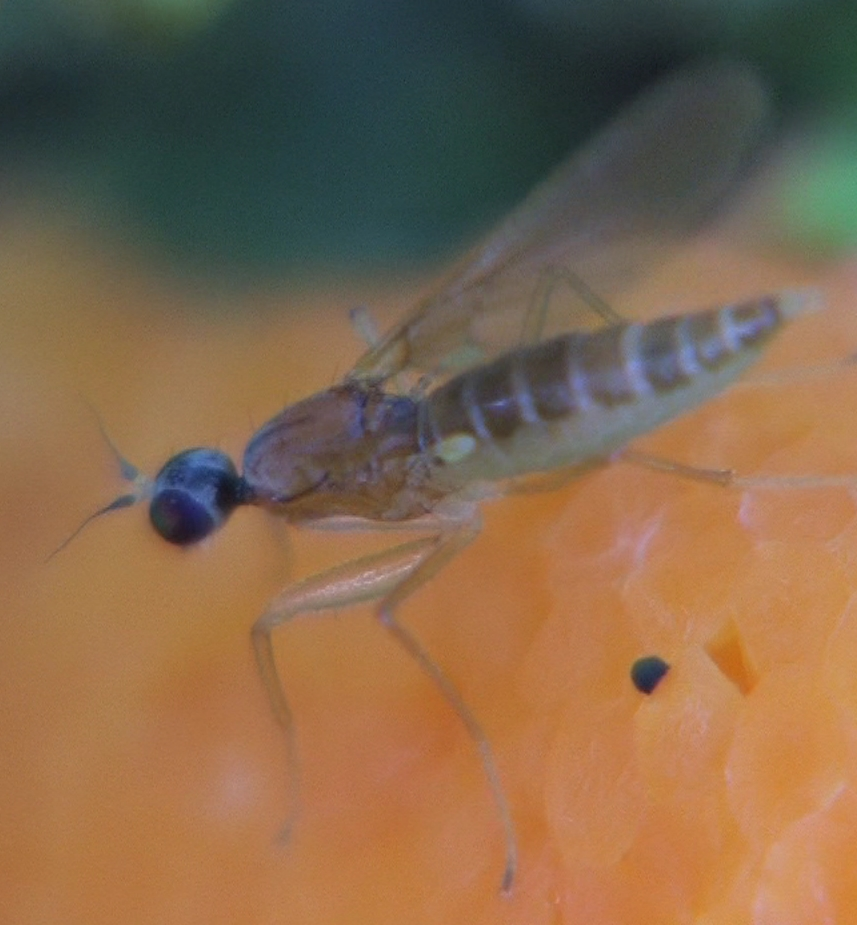
- Phyllodromia melanocephala

Scientific classification
- Kingdom: Animalia
- Phylum: Arthropoda
- Clade: Pancrustacea
- Class: Insecta
- Order: Diptera
- Family: Empididae
- Subfamily: Hemerodromiinae
- Tribe: Chelipodini
- Genus: Phyllodromia; Zetterstedt, 1837

Type species
- Empis melanocephala Fabricius, 1794

= Phyllodromia =

Genus of flies

Phyllodromia is a genus of dance flies (insects in the family Empididae). There are about 10 described species in Phyllodromia.

== Species ==
These 10 species belong to the genus Phyllodromia:

- P. americana Melander, 1947
- P. falcata Plant, 2005
- P. flexura Plant, 2005
- P. floridula Plant, 2005
- P. fusca (Bezzi, 1914)
- P. melanocephala (Fabricius, 1794)
- P. nigricoxa Plant, 2005
- P. proiecta Plant, 2005
- P. scopulifera Collin, 1928
- P. striata Collin, 1928
