= Porphyrochroa =

Scientific classification
- Kingdom: Animalia
- Phylum: Arthropoda
- Class: Insecta
- Order: Diptera
- Family: Empididae
- Subfamily: Empidinae
- Genus: Porphyrochroa; Melander, 1928

Type species
- Sciodromia palliatus Coquillett, 1902

Genus of flies

Porphyrochroa is a genus of flies in the family Empididae.

== Species ==
- P. aliena Mendonça, Rafael & Ale-Rocha, 2008
- P. amazonica Mendonça, Rafael & Ale-Rocha, 2008
- P. argentata Rafael & Ale-Rocha, 2002
- P. bifida Mendonça, Rafael & Ale-Rocha, 2008
- P. cercosingularis Mendonça, Rafael & Ale-Rocha, 2008
- P. dactiliodes Mendonça, Rafael & Ale-Rocha, 2008
- P. distincta Mendonça, Rafael & Ale-Rocha, 2008
- P. dominicanensis Rafael & Ale-Rocha, 2002
- P. elongata Mendonça, Rafael & Ale-Rocha, 2007
- P. amazonica Mendonça, Rafael & Ale-Rocha, 2008
- P. epandrialis Mendonça, Rafael & Ale-Rocha, 2008
- P. genalis Rafael & Ale-Rocha, 2002
- P. grandis Mendonça, Rafael & Ale-Rocha, 2008
- P. hipandriociliaris Mendonça, Rafael & Ale-Rocha, 2007
- P. latifrons Rafael & Ale-Rocha, 2002
- P. longiseta Mendonça, Rafael & Ale-Rocha, 2008
- P. manauara Mendonça, Rafael & Ale-Rocha, 2008
- P. neblina Mendonça, Rafael & Ale-Rocha, 2008
- P. pacaraima Mendonça, Rafael & Ale-Rocha, 2008
- P. palliata (Coquillett, 1902)
- P. pectinata Rafael & Ale-Rocha, 2002
- P. platypoderis Mendonça, Rafael & Ale-Rocha, 2008
- P. quadrilamelaris Mendonça, Rafael & Ale-Rocha, 2008
- P. roraimensis Mendonça, Rafael & Ale-Rocha, 2008
- P. simplex Mendonça, Rafael & Ale-Rocha, 2008
- P. vidali Mendonça, Rafael & Ale-Rocha, 2007
- P. xavieri Mendonça, Rafael & Ale-Rocha, 2008
