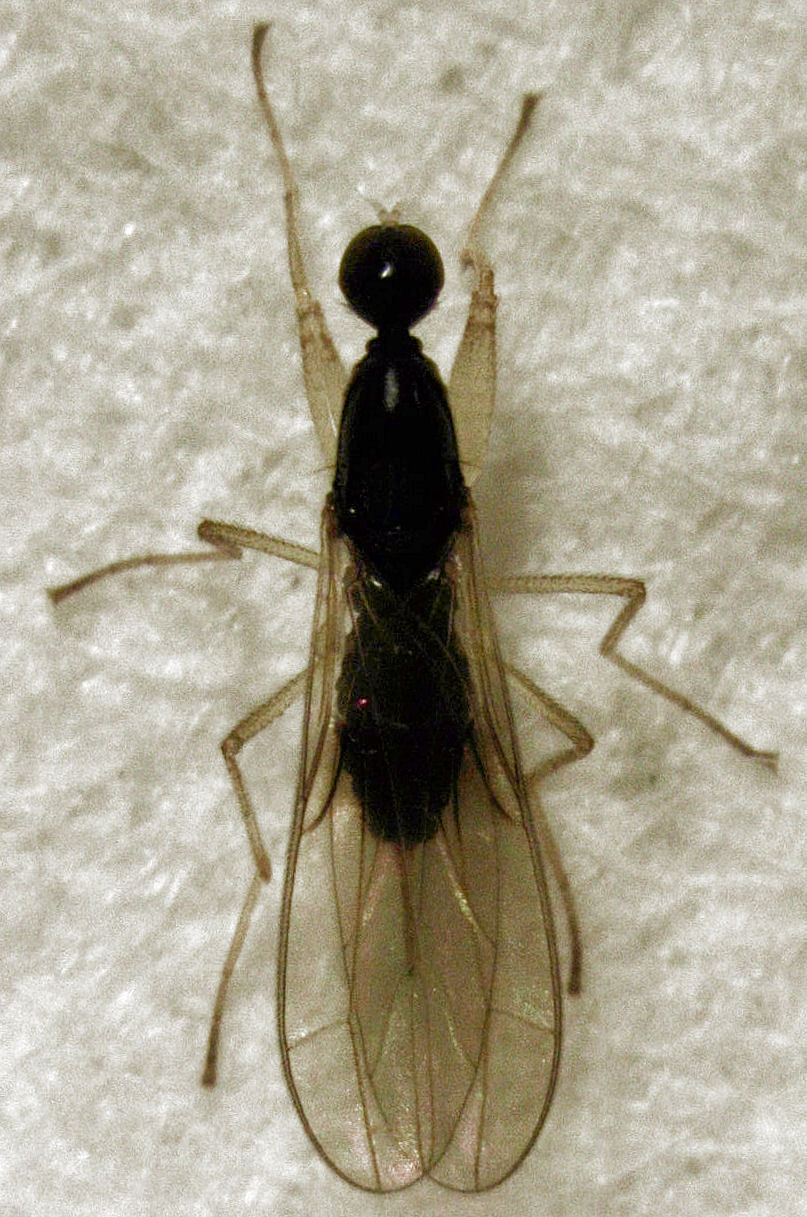
- Antipodromia radialis (female)

Scientific classification
- Kingdom: Animalia
- Phylum: Arthropoda
- Class: Insecta
- Order: Diptera
- Family: Empididae
- Subfamily: Hemerodromiinae
- Genus: Antipodromia; Plant, 2011
- Species: A. radialis

Binomial name
- Antipodromia radialis (Collin, 1928)

Synonyms
- Hemerodromia radialis Collin, 1928

= Antipodromia =

Genus of flies

Antipodromia is a monotypic genus of fly from New Zealand that was first described by Adrian Plant in 2011.
