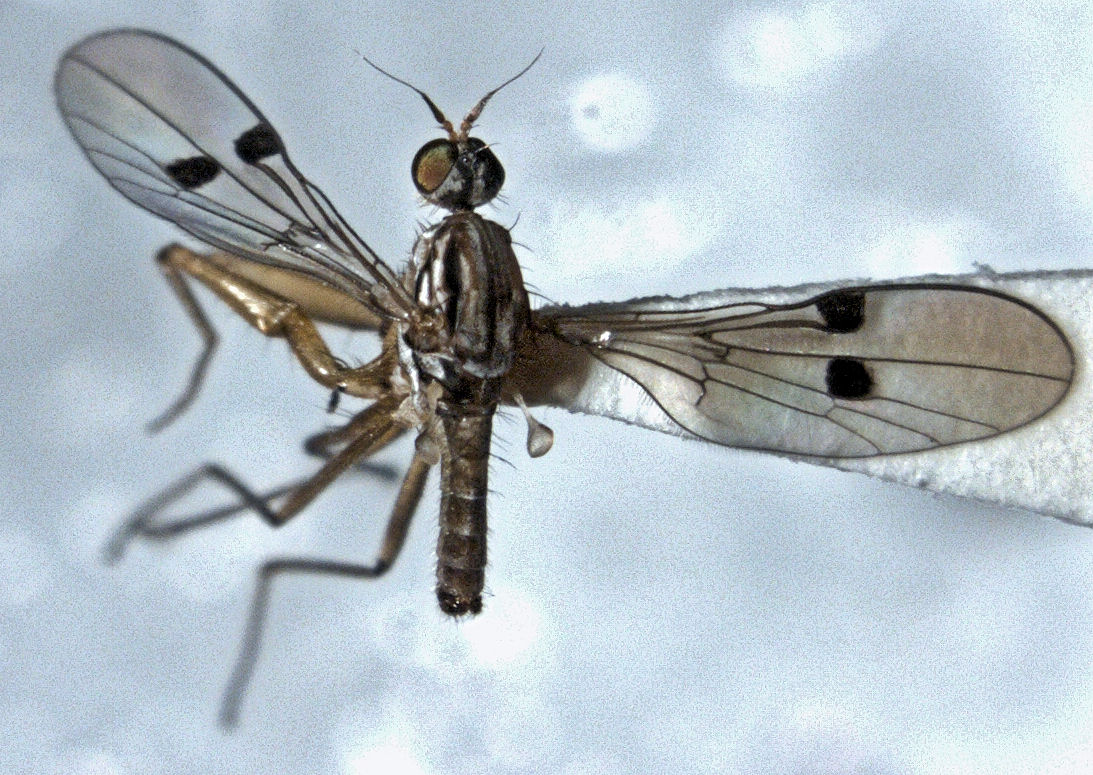
- Chelipoda mirabilis

Scientific classification
- Kingdom: Animalia
- Phylum: Arthropoda
- Class: Insecta
- Order: Diptera
- Family: Empididae
- Subfamily: Hemerodromiinae
- Genus: Chelipoda; Macquart, 1823

Type species
- Tachydromia mantispa Panzer, 1806

Synonyms
- Achelipoda Yang, Zhang & Zhang, 2007; Chiromantis Rondani, 1856; Chryomantis Collin, 1961; Chyromantis Rondani, 1856; Lepidomya Bigot, 1857; Lepidomyia Bezzi, 1903; Lepidomyia Kertész, 1909; Litanomyia Melander, 1902

= Chelipoda =

Genus of flies

Chelipoda is a genus of flies in the family Empididae.

== Species ==
- C. abjecta Collin, 1928
- C. albiseta Zetterstedt, 1838
- C. arcta Yang & Yang, 1990
- C. aritarita Plant, 2007
- C. atrocitas Plant, 2007
- C. australpina Plant, 2007
- C. basalis Yang & Yang, 1990
- C. brevipennis Plant, 2007
- C. consignata Collin, 1928
- C. contracta Melander, 1947
- C. coreana Wagner, 2003
- C. cornigera Plant, 2007
- C. cycloseta Plant, 2007
- C. delecta Collin, 1928
- C. delicata Meunier, 1908
- C. didhami Plant, 2007
- C. digressa Collin, 1931
- C. dolosa Meunier, 1908
- C. dominatrix Plant, 2007
- C. elongata Melander, 1902
- C. ferocitrix Plant, 2007
- C. fimbriata Collin, 1933
- C. flavida Brunetti, 1913
- C. fuscicornis Bezzi, 1912
- C. fusciseta Bezzi, 1912
- C. fuscoptera Plant, 2007
- C. gansuensis Yang & Yang, 1990
- C. gracilis Plant, 2007
- C. hamatilis Collin, 1933
- C. hubeiensis Yang & Yang, 1990
- C. inconspicua Collin, 1928
- C. indica Brunetti, 1913
- C. inexspectata Tuomikoski, 1966
- C. intermedia Smith, 1962
- C. interposita Collin, 1928
- C. keta Smith, 1965
- C. lateralis Plant, 2007
- C. limitaria MacDonald, 1993
- C. longicornis Collin, 1928
- C. lyneborgi Yang & Yang, 1990
- C. macrostigma Plant, 2007
- C. mediolinea Plant, 2007
- C. menglunana Grootaert, Yang & Saigusa, 2000
- C. mengyangana Grootaert, Yang & Saigusa, 2000
- C. mexicana Wheeler & Melander, 1901
- C. mirabilis Collin, 1928
- C. moderata Collin, 1928
- C. modica Collin, 1928
- C. mollis Wagner, 2003
- C. monorhabdos Plant, 2007
- C. nigrans Melander, 1928
- C. nigraristata Yang, Grootaert & Horvat, 2004
- C. oblata Collin, 1928
- C. oblinata Smith, 1989
- C. oblinita Collin, 1928
- C. obtusipennis Collin, 1933
- C. otiraensis Miller, 1923
- C. parva Melander, 1928
- C. petiolata Yang & Yang, 1987
- C. pictipennis Bezzi, 1912
- C. praestans Melander, 1947
- C. puhihiroa Plant, 2007
- C. rakiuraensis Plant, 2007
- C. rangopango Plant, 2007
- C. recurva Collin, 1928
- C. remissa Collin, 1933
- C. rhabdoptera Melander, 1928
- C. secreta Collin, 1928
- C. shennongana Yang & Yang, 1990
- C. sicaria Melander, 1947
- C. sichuanensis Yang & Yang, 1993
- C. sinensis Yang & Yang, 1987
- C. subflava Collin, 1933
- C. tainuia Plant, 2007
- C. tangerina Plant, 2007
- C. trepida Collin, 1928
- C. tribulosus Yang, Yang & Hu, 2002
- C. truncata MacDonald, 1993
- C. ulrichi Yang, Yang & Hu, 2002
- C. ultraferox Plant, 2007
- C. vaga Meunier, 1908
- C. venatrix Plant, 2007
- C. vittata Lynch Arribálzaga, 1878
- C. vocatoria Fallén, 1815
- C. wudangensis Yang & Yang, 1990
- C. xanthocephala Yang & Yang, 1990
