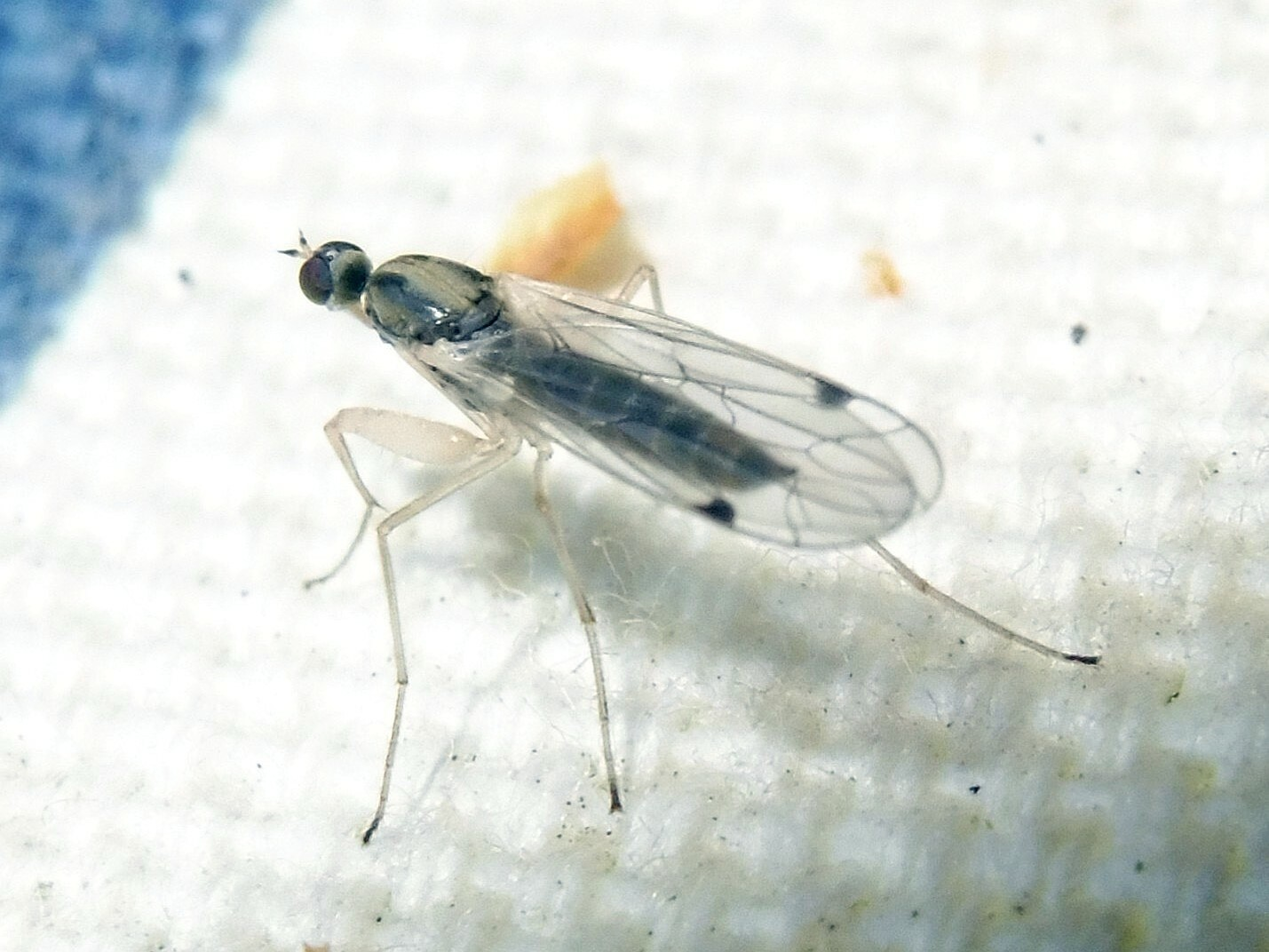

Scientific classification
- Kingdom: Animalia
- Phylum: Arthropoda
- Class: Insecta
- Order: Diptera
- Family: Empididae
- Subfamily: Hemerodromiinae
- Genus: Chelifera; Macquart, 1823

Type species
- Chelifera raptor Macquart, 1823

Synonyms
- Mantipeza Rondani, 1856; Polydromia Verrall, 1882; Polydromia Kertész, 1909; Polydromya Bigot, 1857; Thanategia Melander, 1928

= Chelifera =

Genus of flies

Chelifera is a genus of flies in the family Empididae.

== Species ==
- C. accomodata Wagner, Leese & Panesar, 2004
- C. alpina Vaillant, 1981
- C. angusta Collin, 1927
- C. aperticauda Collin, 1927
- C. apicata Collin, 1928
- C. astigma Collin, 1927
- C. bakra (Smith, 1965)
- C. banski Melander, 1947
- C. barbarica Vaillant, 1981
- C. berdeni Vaillant, 1978
- C. bidenta MacDonald, 1994
- C. brevidigitata Wagner, Leese & Panesar, 2004
- C. caliga Lavallee, 1975
- C. chvalai Wagner, 1984
- C. circinata MacDonald, 1994
- C. cirrata Melander, 1947
- C. concinnicauda Collin, 1927
- C. corsicana Vaillant, 1981
- C. curvata Wagner, Leese & Panesar, 2004
- C. defecta (Loew, 1862)
- C. detestata (Meunier, 1908)
- C. digitata Wagner, Leese & Panesar, 2004
- C. diversicauda Collin, 1927
- C. emeishanica Horvat, 2002
- C. ensifera Melander, 1947
- C. erecta Collin, 1927
- C. fascipennis (Meijere, 1913)
- C. flavella (Zetterstedt, 1838)
- C. fontinalis (Miller, 1923)
- C. freemanni Vaillant, 1978
- C. frigelii (Zetterstedt, 1838)
- C. giraudae Vaillant, 1981
- C. haeselbarthae Wagner, Leese & Panesar, 2004
- C. incisa Saigusa & Yang, 2003
- C. insueta Wagner, Leese & Panesar, 2004
- C. khemisiana Vaillant & Gagneur, 1998
- C. knutsoni Lavallee, 1975
- C. kozaneki Wagner, 2003
- C. lapponica Frey, 1950
- C. lateralis Yang & Yang, 1995
- C. lovetti Melander, 1947
- C. macedonica Wagner & Niesiolowski, 1987
- C. malickyi Horvat, 2002
- C. mana Lavallee, 1975
- C. mantiformis (Cuvier, 1795)
- C. monostigma (Meigen, 1822)
- C. multidenta MacDonald, 1994
- C. multiseta Wagner, Leese & Panesar, 2004
- C. multisetoides Wagner, Leese & Panesar, 2004
- C. nanlingensis Yang, Grootaert & Horvat, 2005
- C. neangusta MacDonald, 1994
- C. notata (Loew, 1862)
- C. nubecula (Becker, 1908)
- C. obscura Vaillant, 1968
- C. obsoleta (Loew, 1862)
- C. ornamenta Horvat, 2002
- C. pallida Vaillant, 1981
- C. palloris (Coquillett, 1895)
- C. pectinicauda Collin, 1927
- C. perlucida Niesiolowski, 1986
- C. polonica Wagner & Niesiolowski, 1987
- C. precabunda Collin, 1961
- C. precatoria (Fallén, 1815)
- C. prectoria (Fallén, 1816)
- C. pyrenaica Vaillant, 1981
- C. rastrifera Melander, 1947
- C. recurvata (Melander, 1947)
- C. rhombicercus Wagner, Leese & Panesar, 2004
- C. scrotifera Melander, 1947
- C. serraticauda Engel, 1939
- C. sheni Saigusa & Yang, 2003
- C. sinensis Yang & Yang, 1995
- C. siveci Wagner, 1984
- C. spectra Vaillant, 1981
- C. stauderae Wagner, Leese & Panesar, 2004
- C. stigmatica (Schiner, 1860)
- C. stuprator (Melander, 1947)
- C. subangusta Collin, 1961
- C. subensifera MacDonald, 1994
- C. subnotata MacDonald, 1994
- C. tacita Collin, 1928
- C. tantula Collin, 1928
- C. thaica Horvat, 2002
- C. trapezina (Zetterstedt, 1838)
- C. valida (Loew, 1862)
- C. varix Melander, 1947
- C. vicina (Wagner, 2003)
- C. vockerothi Vaillant & Chvála, 1973
- C. wagneri Horvat, 1990
