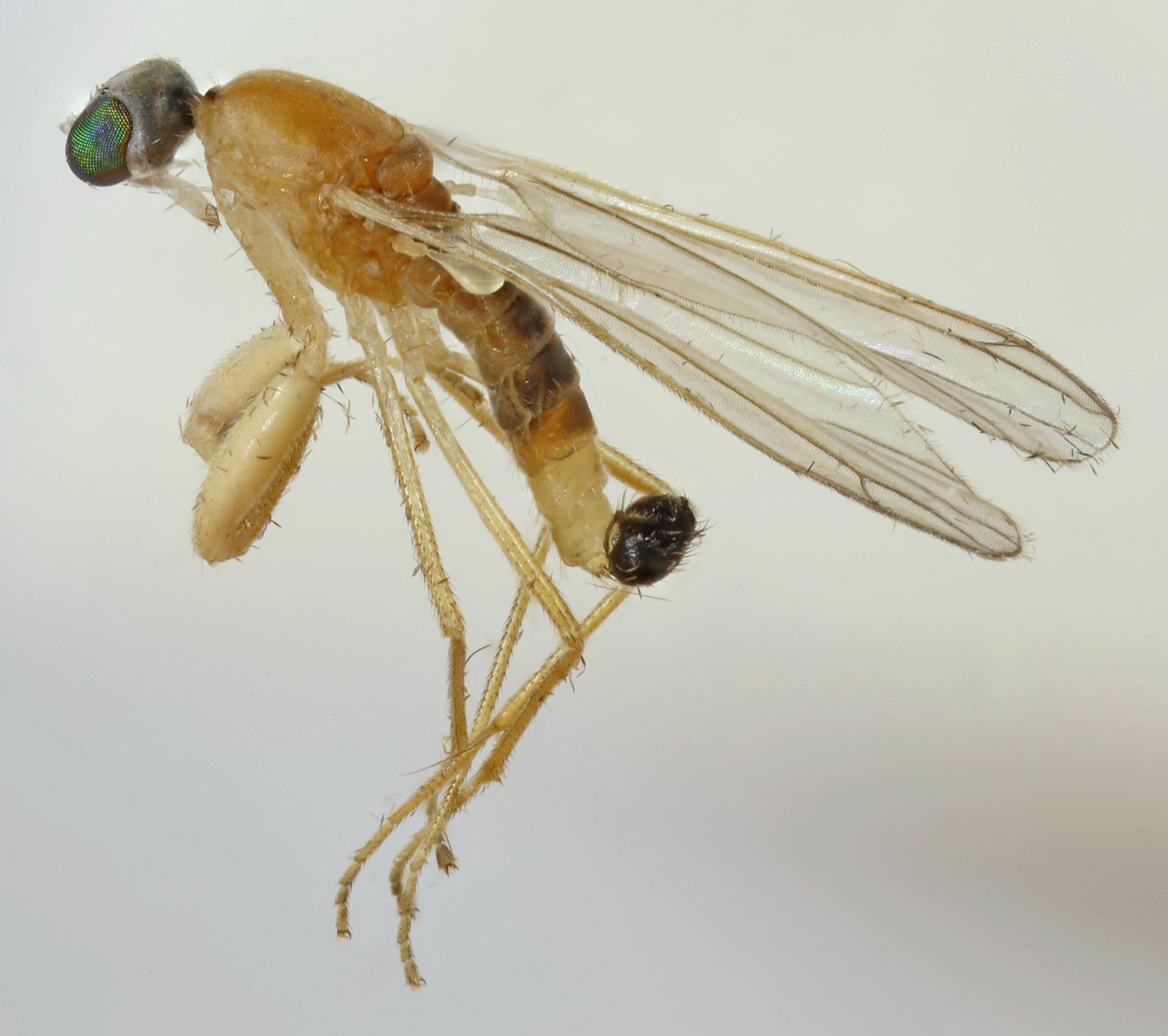
- Hemerodromia adulatoria

Scientific classification
- Kingdom: Animalia
- Phylum: Arthropoda
- Clade: Pancrustacea
- Class: Insecta
- Order: Diptera
- Family: Empididae
- Subfamily: Hemerodromiinae
- Tribe: Hemerodromiini
- Genus: Hemerodromia; Meigen, 1822

Type species
- Hemerodromia oratoria Fallén, 1816

Diversity
- at least 170 species

= Hemerodromia =

Genus of flies

Hemerodromia is a genus of dance flies in the family Empididae. There are at least 170 described species in Hemerodromia.

== See also ==
- List of Hemerodromia species
