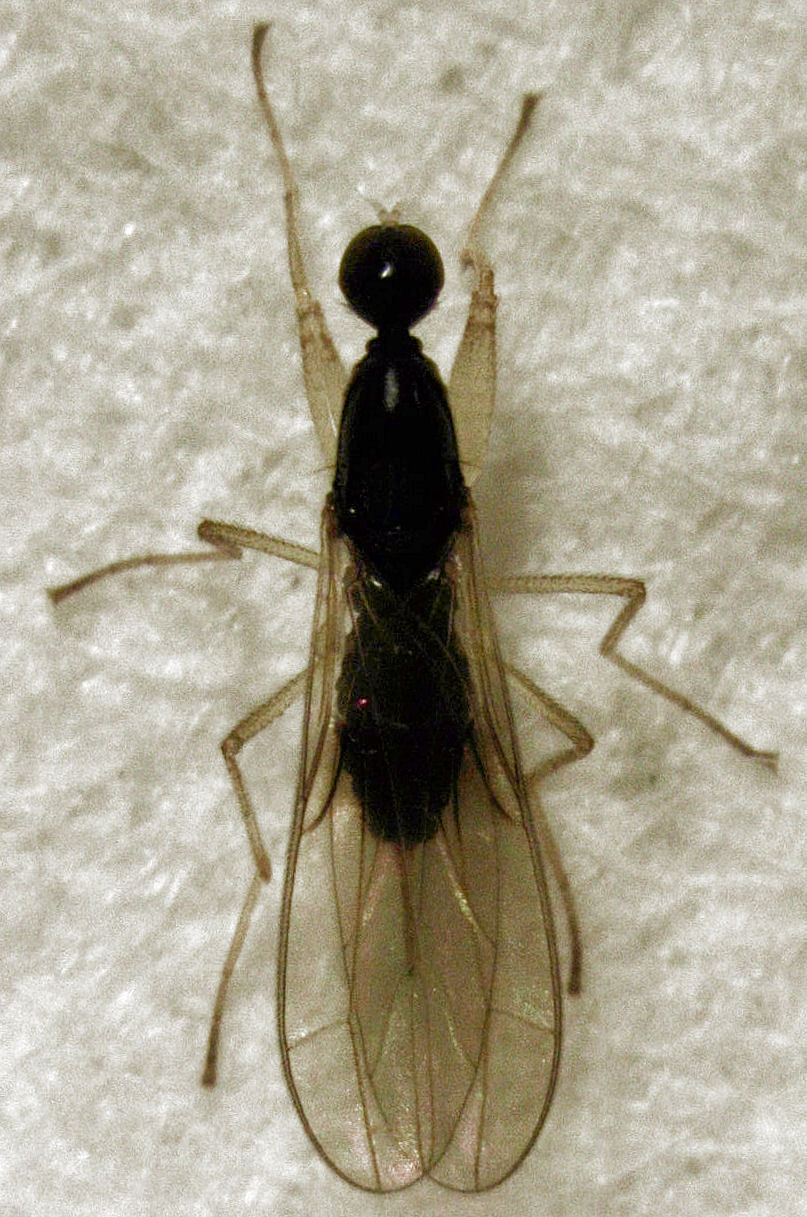
- Antipodromia radialis (female)

Scientific classification
- Domain: Eukaryota
- Kingdom: Animalia
- Phylum: Arthropoda
- Class: Insecta
- Order: Diptera
- Family: Empididae
- Subfamily: Hemerodromiinae

Genera
- See text

= Hemerodromiinae =

Subfamily of flies

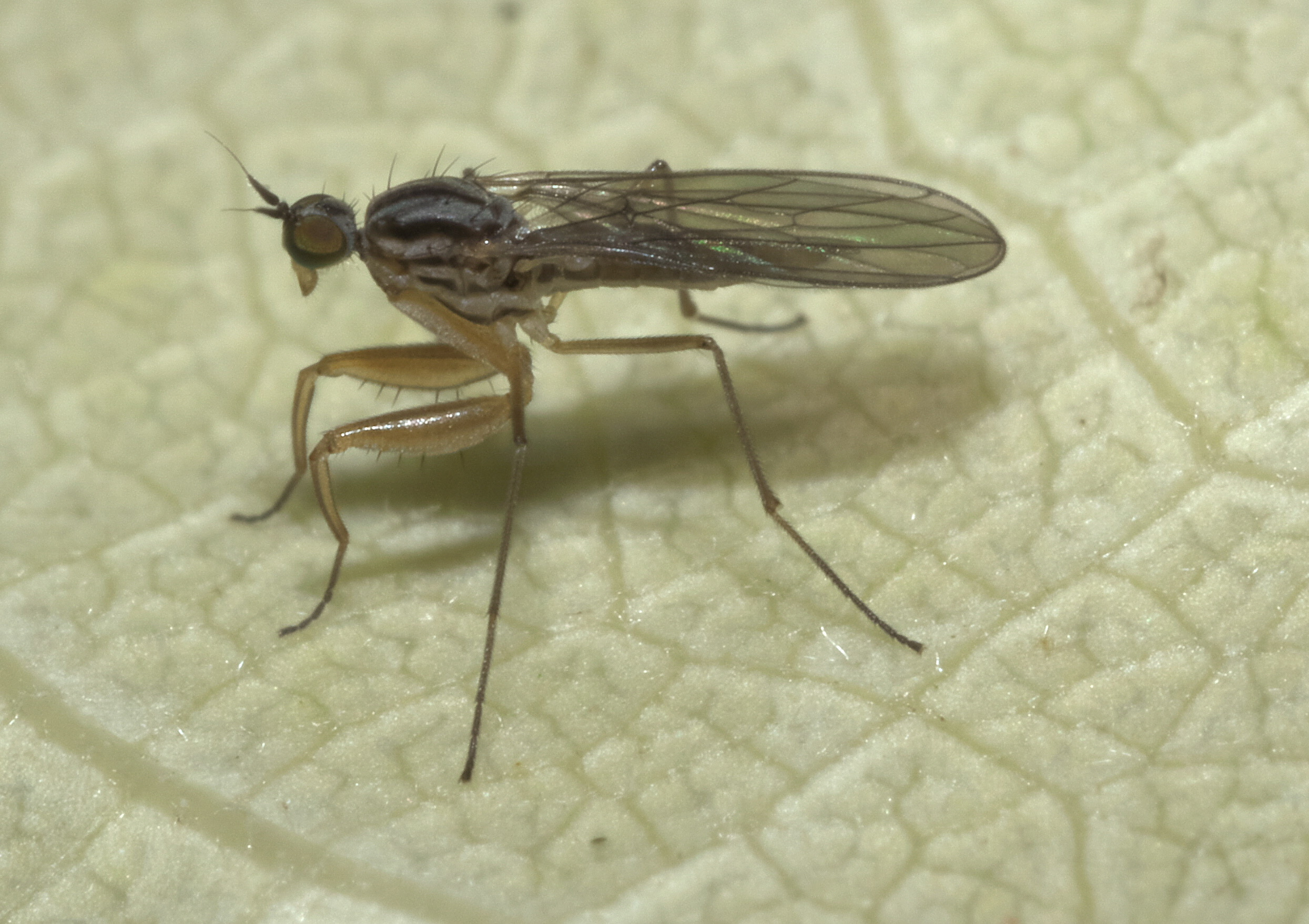
Chelipoda sp. from New Zealand

Hemerodromiinae are a worldwide group of predatory flies in the family Empididae with raptorial forelegs.

== Genera ==
- Afrodromia Smith, 1969
- Antipodromia Plant, 2011
- Chelifera Macquart, 1823
- Chelipoda Macquart, 1823
- Chelipodozus Collin, 1933
- Cladodromia Bezzi, 1905
- Colabris Melander, 1928
- Doliodromia Collin, 1928
- Drymodromia Bezzi, 1914
- Dryodromya Rondani, 1856
- Hemerodromia Meigen, 1822
- Metachela Coquillett, 1903
- Monodromia Collin, 1928
- Neoplasta Coquillett, 1895
- Phyllodromia Zetterstedt, 1837
- Ptilophyllodromia Bezzi, 1904
