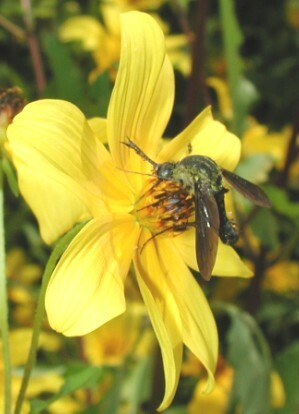
- Lepidophora sp. (Bombyliidae) on Bidens laevis

Scientific classification
- Domain: Eukaryota
- Kingdom: Animalia
- Phylum: Arthropoda
- Class: Insecta
- Order: Diptera
- Suborder: Brachycera
- Infraorder: Asilomorpha

Groups included
- Superfamilies Asiloidea Empidoidea Nemestrinoidea

Cladistically included but traditionally excluded taxa
- Muscomorpha

= Asilomorpha =

Infraorder of flies

The Brachyceran infraorder Asilomorpha is a large and diverse group of flies, containing the bulk of the nonmuscoid Brachycera. The larvae of asilomorphs are extremely diverse in habits, as well.

== Classification ==
In most modern classifications, the infraorder Asilomorpha is not recognized, as it is paraphyletic; the Empidoidea are the sister taxon to the Muscomorpha (used here in the same sense as the traditional Cyclorrhapha, not following the Tree of Life Web Project system in this one instance). However, these modern classifications are not Linnaean, and - while relatively easy to visualize on a phylogenetic tree diagram - do not lend themselves to any classification that uses Linnaean ranks (see discussion for details). Also, some classifications place the Nemestrinoidea within the Tabanomorpha, though this is not widely accepted.
