= Macrostomus xavieri =

Scientific classification
- Kingdom: Animalia
- Phylum: Arthropoda
- Clade: Pancrustacea
- Class: Insecta
- Order: Diptera
- Superfamily: Empidoidea
- Family: Empididae
- Subfamily: Empidinae
- Genus: Macrostomus
- Species: M. xavieri

Binomial name
- Macrostomus xavieri Rafael and Cumming, 2015

Species of fly

Macrostomus xavieri is a species of dance flies, in the fly family Empididae. It is only found in the Amazon basin across the countries of Brazil and Guyana. It is 2.3 mm (0.091 in) long, with wings 2.3 mm (0.091 in) long, and has a glossy black body with velvety-black antennae, brown palpi, dark brown halteres, and largely glossy yellow legs.

== Taxonomy ==
Macrostomus xavieri was formally described in 2015 based on a male specimen collected from Manaus in Amazonas, Brazil, in 1993. The species is named after Francisco Felipe Xavier Filho, a Brazilian insect collector who has worked extensively in the Amazon. It seems to be closely related to M. amazonensis and M. paraiba.

== Description ==
The holotype male had a body 2.3 mm (0.091 in) long and wings 2.3 mm (0.091 in) long. Macrostomus xavieri is characterized by a black abdomen and thorax. Males have a short tergite 8, with a shallow cavity towards the front. The hind tibiae lack feather-like setae. The cerci curve to the inside. In females, all the coxae are yellow, excluding the front pair which are black. Females also have black rear femurs with yellow bands.

In terms of coloration, males have glossy black abdomens and thoraxes, velvety-black antennae, brown palpi, and dark brown halteres. The legs are largely glossy yellow with some black portions.

== Distribution ==
The species is found in the Amazon basin, having been recorded from the Brazilian state of Amazonas and Kaieteur National Park in Guyana.
