= Opeatocerata melanderi =

Scientific classification
- Kingdom: Animalia
- Phylum: Arthropoda
- Class: Insecta
- Order: Diptera
- Superfamily: Empidoidea
- Family: Empididae
- Subfamily: Empidinae
- Genus: Opeatocerata
- Species: O. melanderi

Binomial name
- Opeatocerata melanderi Câmara & Rafael, 2011

Species of fly

Opeatocerata melanderi is a species of dance flies, in the fly family Empididae.
