= Macrostomus grallatrix =

Scientific classification
- Kingdom: Animalia
- Phylum: Arthropoda
- Class: Insecta
- Order: Diptera
- Superfamily: Empidoidea
- Family: Empididae
- Subfamily: Empidinae
- Genus: Macrostomus
- Species: M. grallatrix

Binomial name
- Macrostomus grallatrix Bezzi, 1909

Species of fly

Macrostomus grallatrix is a species of dance flies, in the fly family Empididae.
