= Macrostomus palliatus =

Scientific classification
- Kingdom: Animalia
- Phylum: Arthropoda
- Clade: Pancrustacea
- Class: Insecta
- Order: Diptera
- Superfamily: Empidoidea
- Family: Empididae
- Subfamily: Empidinae
- Genus: Macrostomus
- Species: M. palliatus

Binomial name
- Macrostomus palliatus (Coquillett, 1902)

Synonyms
- Sciodromia palliatus Coquillett, 1902

Species of fly

Macrostomus palliatus is a species of dance flies, in the fly family Empididae.
