= Opeatocerata =

Scientific classification
- Domain: Eukaryota
- Kingdom: Animalia
- Phylum: Arthropoda
- Class: Insecta
- Order: Diptera
- Family: Empididae
- Subfamily: Empidinae
- Genus: Opeatocerata; Melander, 1928

Type species
- Empis rubida Wheeler & Melander, 1901

Genus of flies

Opeatocerata is a genus of flies in the family Empididae.

== Species ==
- O. cooperi Smith, 1991
- O. lopesi Smith, 1991
- O. melanderi Câmara & Rafael, 2011
- O. rubida (Wheeler & Melander, 1901)
- O. stubbsi Smith, 1991
- O. trilobata Câmara & Rafael, 2011
