= Macrostomus amazonensis =

Scientific classification
- Kingdom: Animalia
- Phylum: Arthropoda
- Clade: Pancrustacea
- Class: Insecta
- Order: Diptera
- Superfamily: Empidoidea
- Family: Empididae
- Subfamily: Empidinae
- Genus: Macrostomus
- Species: M. amazonensis

Binomial name
- Macrostomus amazonensis Rafael and Cumming, 2015

Species of fly

Macrostomus amazonensis is a species of dance flies, in the fly family Empididae. It is only found in the Amazon basin across the countries of Brazil and Guyana. It is 2.6 mm (0.10 in) long, with wings 2.7 mm (0.11 in) long, and has a glossy black body with velvety-black antennae, brown palpi, light brown halteres, and largely glossy yellow legs.

== Taxonomy ==
Macrostomus amazonensis was formally described in 2015 based on a male specimen collected from Jaú National Park in Amazonas, Brazil, in 1996. Its specific epithet alludes to its large range across the Amazon basin. It is apparently sister to M. paraiba within its species group.

== Description ==
The holotype male had a body 2.6 mm (0.10 in) long and wings 2.7 mm (0.11 in) long. Macrostomus amazonensis is characterized by a black abdomen and thorax, with yellow coxae. Males have a short tergite 8, with a shallow cavity towards the front and a deeper one towards the back. Females have feather-like setae on their hind tibia. The hypandrium has a well-defined cavity along the back edge and numerous pairs of setae along the center.

In terms of coloration, males have glossy black abdomens and thoraxes, velvety-black antennae, brown palpi, and light brown halteres. The legs are largely glossy yellow, but the tarsi and hind tibiae are black. Females have yellow to dark brown legs.

== Distribution ==
The species has a large range throughout the Amazon, being found in the Brazilian states of Amazonas, Mato Grosso, Roraima, and Rondônia, as well as along the Mazaruni River in Guyana.
