= Macrostomus falcatus =

Scientific classification
- Kingdom: Animalia
- Phylum: Arthropoda
- Clade: Pancrustacea
- Class: Insecta
- Order: Diptera
- Superfamily: Empidoidea
- Family: Empididae
- Subfamily: Empidinae
- Genus: Macrostomus
- Species: M. falcatus

Binomial name
- Macrostomus falcatus Rafael and Marques, 2019

Species of fly

Macrostomus falcatus is a species of dance flies, in the fly family Empididae.
