= Macrostomus albicaudatus =

Scientific classification
- Kingdom: Animalia
- Phylum: Arthropoda
- Clade: Pancrustacea
- Class: Insecta
- Order: Diptera
- Superfamily: Empidoidea
- Family: Empididae
- Subfamily: Empidinae
- Genus: Macrostomus
- Species: M. albicaudatus

Binomial name
- Macrostomus albicaudatus Rafael and Cumming, 2015

Species of fly

Macrostomus albicaudatus is a species of dance flies, in the fly family Empididae.
