= Macrostomus =

Scientific classification
- Kingdom: Animalia
- Phylum: Arthropoda
- Clade: Pancrustacea
- Class: Insecta
- Order: Diptera
- Family: Empididae
- Subfamily: Empidinae
- Genus: Macrostomus; Wiedemann, 1817

Type species
- Hybos ferrugineus Fabricius, 1805

Synonyms
- Axelempis Curran, 1931

Genus of flies

Macrostomus is a genus of flies in the family Empididae.

== Species ==
- M. abdominalis Bezzi, 1905
- M. acreanus Rafael and Cumming, 2015
- M. albicaudatus Rafael and Cumming, 2015
- M. alpinus Rafael & Cumming, 2006
- M. amazonensis Rafael and Cumming, 2015
- M. apicalis Bezzi, 1909
- M. arcucinctus Bezzi, 1909
- M. argyrotarsis Bezzi, 1909
- M. barueri Smith, 1962
- M. ciliaticosta Rafael & Cumming, 2006
- M. cysticercus Smith, 1963
- M. digitatus Smith, 1962
- M. distinctipennis Smith, 1962
- M. divisus Smith, 1962
- M. dolichocerus Bezzi, 1905
- M. dolichopterus Bezzi, 1909
- M. falcatus Rafael and Marques, 2019
- M. fasciventris (Curran, 1931)
- M. ferrugineus (Fabricius, 1805)
- M. flavus Rafael and Cumming, 2009
- M. fulvithorax Curran, 1931
- M. furcatus Rafael and Cumming, 2009
- M. fuscithorax Rafael and Cumming, 2009
- M. fusciventris Rafael and Cumming, 2009
- M. grallatrix Bezzi, 1909
- M. inflatus Rafael and Cumming, 2012
- M. juri Smith, 1962
- M. limbipennis Bezzi, 1909
- M. lineatus Rafael & Cumming, 2006
- M. longipennis Rafael and Cumming, 2009
- M. macerrimus Bezzi, 1909
- M. manauara Rafael and Cumming, 2010
- M. melanothorax Rafael and Cumming, 2009
- M. montanus Rafael and Marques, 2019
- M. mundurucu Smith, 1962
- M. mura Smith, 1962
- M. nigriventris Macquart, 1846
- M. nitidus Rafael and Cumming, 2012
- M. occidentalis Rafael & Cumming, 2006
- M. orthoneura Bezzi, 1905
- M. pacaraima Rafael and Cumming, 2010
- M. palliatus (Coquillett, 1902)
- M. paraiba Rafael and Cumming, 2015
- M. penai Rafael & Cumming, 2006
- M. perpulchrus Bezzi, 1909
- M. pictipennis Bezzi, 1909
- M. pulchriventris Bezzi, 1905
- M. rodriguezi Rafael and Marques, 2019
- M. rotundipennis Bezzi, 1905
- M. seticauda Smith, 1963
- M. smithi Rafael and Cumming, 2010
- M. tarsalis Rafael & Cumming, 2006
- M. trifidus Rafael and Marques, 2019
- M. trilineatus Rafael and Marques, 2019
- M. trombetensis Rafael and Cumming, 2015
- M. utinga Rafael and Cumming, 2010
- M. variseta Smith, 1962
- M. wiedemanni Smith, 1962
- M. xavieri Rafael and Cumming, 2015
