= Chersodromia inusitata =

Scientific classification
- Kingdom: Animalia
- Phylum: Arthropoda
- Class: Insecta
- Order: Diptera
- Family: Hybotidae
- Subfamily: Tachydromiinae
- Tribe: Drapetini
- Genus: Chersodromia
- Species: C. inusitata

Binomial name
- Chersodromia inusitata (Melander, 1902)

Synonyms
- Coloboneura inusitata Melander, 1902

Species of fly

Chersodromia inusitata is a species of hybotid dance fly in the family Hybotidae.

== Distribution ==
United States.
