= Chersodromia insignita =

Scientific classification
- Kingdom: Animalia
- Phylum: Arthropoda
- Class: Insecta
- Order: Diptera
- Family: Hybotidae
- Subfamily: Tachydromiinae
- Tribe: Drapetini
- Genus: Chersodromia
- Species: C. insignita

Binomial name
- Chersodromia insignita Melander, 1945

Species of fly

Chersodromia insignita is a species of hybotid dance fly in the family Hybotidae.

== Distribution ==
C. insignita is found in California.
