= Chersodromia parallela =

Scientific classification
- Kingdom: Animalia
- Phylum: Arthropoda
- Class: Insecta
- Order: Diptera
- Family: Hybotidae
- Subfamily: Tachydromiinae
- Tribe: Drapetini
- Genus: Chersodromia
- Species: C. parallela

Binomial name
- Chersodromia parallela (Melander, 1928)

Synonyms
- Thinodromia parallela Melander, 1928

Species of fly

Chersodromia parallela is a species of hybotid dance flies in the family Hybotidae.

== Distribution ==
United States.
