= Euhybus strumaticus =

Scientific classification
- Kingdom: Animalia
- Phylum: Arthropoda
- Class: Insecta
- Order: Diptera
- Family: Hybotidae
- Subfamily: Hybotinae
- Genus: Euhybus
- Species: E. strumaticus

Binomial name
- Euhybus strumaticus Melander, 1928

Species of fly

Euhybus strumaticus is a species of hybotid dance flies in the family Hybotidae.

== Distribution ==
United States.
