= Trichina =

Scientific classification
- Kingdom: Animalia
- Phylum: Arthropoda
- Class: Insecta
- Order: Diptera
- Family: Hybotidae
- Subfamily: Trichininae
- Genus: Trichina; Meigen, 1830

Type species
- Trichina clavipes Meigen, 1830

Genus of flies

Trichina is a genus of flies in the family Hybotidae.

== Species ==
- Trichina atripes (Melander, 1902)
- Trichina azizi Zouhair & Grootaert, 2022
- Trichina basalis Melander, 1928
- Trichina bilobata Collin, 1926
- Trichina clavipes Meigen, 1830
- Trichina elongata Haliday, 1833
- Trichina flavipes Meigen, 1830
- Trichina fumipennis Frey, 1953
- Trichina nitida Melander, 1928
- Trichina nura (Melander, 1902)
- Trichina opaca Loew, 1864
- Trichina pallipes (Zetterstedt, 1838)
- Trichina pullata Melander, 1928
- Trichina rifensis Zouhair & Grootaert, 2022
- Trichina unilobata Chvála, 1981
