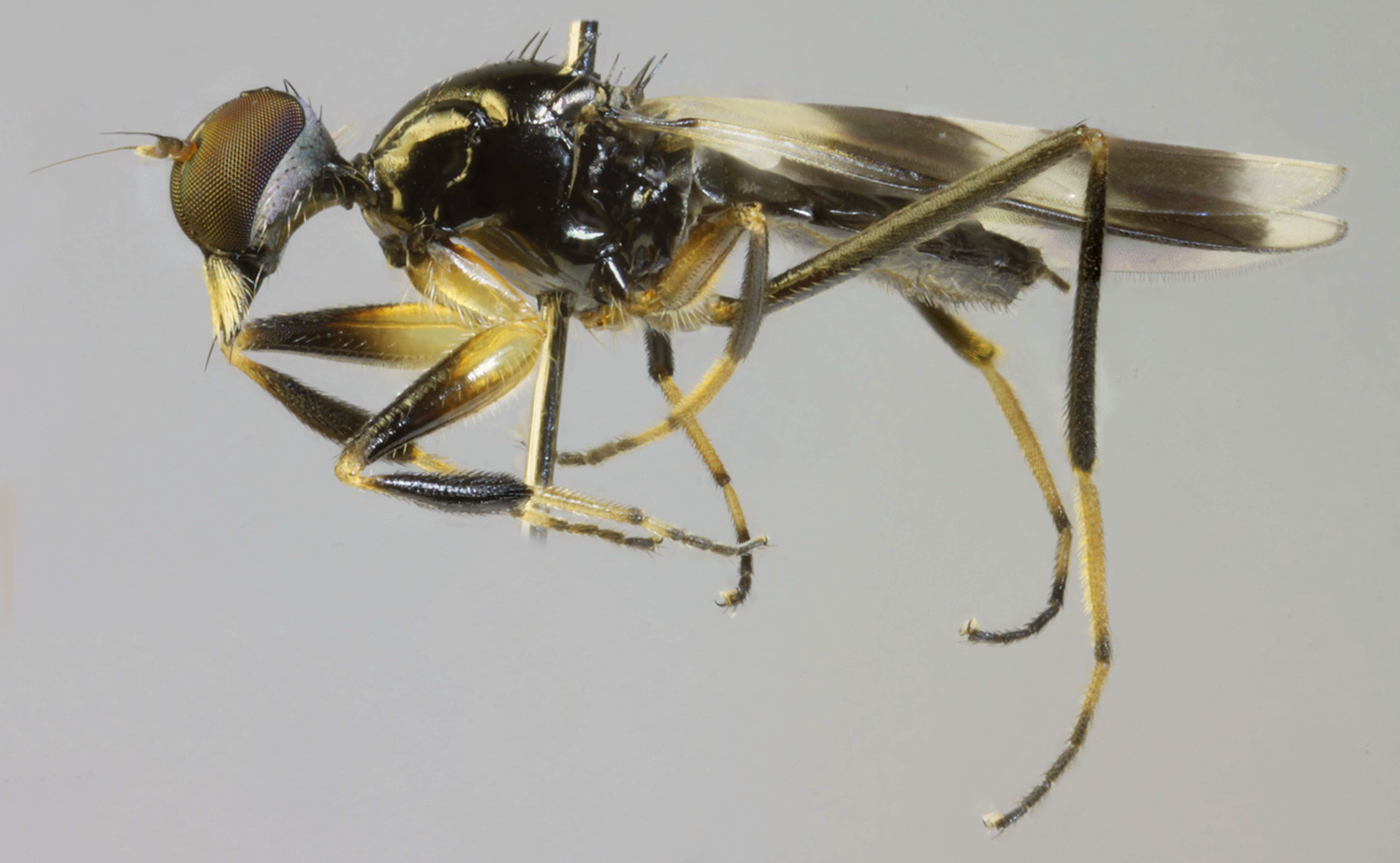
- Tachydromia umbrarum North Wales

Scientific classification
- Kingdom: Animalia
- Phylum: Arthropoda
- Clade: Pancrustacea
- Class: Insecta
- Order: Diptera
- Family: Hybotidae
- Subfamily: Tachydromiinae
- Tribe: Tachydromiini
- Genus: Tachydromia
- Species: T. umbrarum

Binomial name
- Tachydromia umbrarum Haliday, 1833

Synonyms
- Tachypeza albitarsis Zetterstedt, 1838; Tachypeza nova Siebke, 1877

= Tachydromia umbrarum =

Species of fly

Tachydromia umbrarum is a species of fly in the family Hybotidae. It is found in the Palearctic.
