= Symballophthalmus masoni =

Scientific classification
- Kingdom: Animalia
- Phylum: Arthropoda
- Class: Insecta
- Order: Diptera
- Family: Hybotidae
- Subfamily: Tachydromiinae
- Tribe: Symballophthalmini
- Genus: Symballophthalmus
- Species: S. masoni

Binomial name
- Symballophthalmus masoni Chillcott, 1958

Species of fly

Symballophthalmus masoni is a species of hybotid dance flies, insects in the family Hybotidae.

== Distribution ==
United States.
