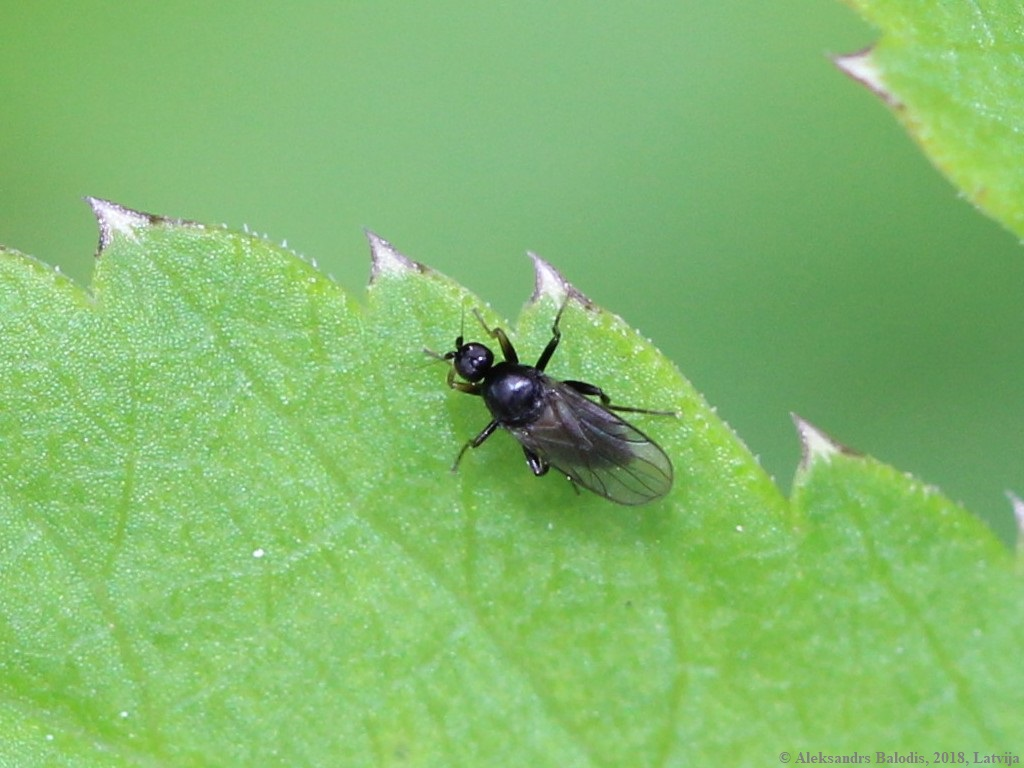
- Crossopalpus nigritellus

Scientific classification
- Kingdom: Animalia
- Phylum: Arthropoda
- Clade: Pancrustacea
- Class: Insecta
- Order: Diptera
- Family: Hybotidae
- Subfamily: Tachydromiinae
- Tribe: Drapetini
- Genus: Crossopalpus; Bigot, 1857

Type species
- Platypalpus ambiguus Macquart, 1828

Synonyms
- Eudrapetis Melander, 1918; Grossopalpus Schiner, 1868; Therinopsis Vimmer, 1939

= Crossopalpus =

Genus of flies

Crossopalpus is a genus of flies in the family Hybotidae.

== Species ==
- Crossopalpus abditus Kovalev, 1972
- Crossopalpus aeneus (Walker, 1871)
- Crossopalpus armata (Melander, 1918)
- Crossopalpus bisetus Yang, Gaimari & Grootaert, 2004
- Crossopalpus bonomettoi Raffone, 1984
- Crossopalpus chvalai Kovalev, 1976
- Crossopalpus cookiensis Smith, 1989
- Crossopalpus cruciatus Kovalev, 1979
- Crossopalpus curvinervis (Zetterstedt, 1842)
- Crossopalpus curvipes (Meigen, 1822)
- Crossopalpus demartini Raffone, 1984
- Crossopalpus dilutipes (Strobl, 1906)
- Crossopalpus discalis (Melander, 1918)
- Crossopalpus diversipes (Melander, 1918)
- Crossopalpus emiliae Kovalev, 1979
- Crossopalpus facialis (Melander, 1918)
- Crossopalpus flavipalpis Kovalev, 1979
- Crossopalpus flexuosus (Loew, 1840)
- Crossopalpus giordanii Raffone, 1983
- Crossopalpus gobiensis Kovalev, 1979
- Crossopalpus guizhouanus Yang & Yang, 1989
- Crossopalpus humilis (Frey, 1913)
- Crossopalpus inculta (Coquillett, 1895)
- Crossopalpus insularis (Melander, 1952)
- Crossopalpus kaszabi Kovalev, 1979
- Crossopalpus kraussi (Quate, 1960)
- Crossopalpus lataus (Coquillett, 1903)
- Crossopalpus medetera (Melander, 1902)
- Crossopalpus minimus (Meigen, 1838)
- Crossopalpus mongolicus Kovalev, 1975
- Crossopalpus montalentii Raffone, 1994
- Crossopalpus nigritellus (Zetterstedt, 1842)
- Crossopalpus parvicornis (Melander, 1918)
- Crossopalpus pilipes (Loew, 1859)
- Crossopalpus rossii Raffone, 1986
- Crossopalpus scissa (Melander, 1918)
- Crossopalpus setiger (Loew, 1859)
- Crossopalpus simplex (Quate, 1960)
- Crossopalpus sinensis Yang & Yang, 1989
- Crossopalpus smithi Kovalev, 1975
- Crossopalpus spectabilis (Melander, 1902)
- Crossopalpus subaenescens Collin, 1960
- Crossopalpus subsetiger Raffone, 1991
- Crossopalpus temasek Grootaert & Shamshev, 2012
- Crossopalpus unipila (Loew, 1872)
- Crossopalpus yunnanensis Yang, Gaimari & Grootaert, 2004
