= Tachyempis =

Scientific classification
- Kingdom: Animalia
- Phylum: Arthropoda
- Class: Insecta
- Order: Diptera
- Family: Hybotidae
- Subfamily: Tachydromiinae
- Tribe: Tachydromiini
- Genus: Tachyempis; Melander, 1928

Type species
- Tachydromia agens Melander, 1910

Genus of flies

Tachyempis is a genus of flies in the family Hybotidae.

== Species ==
- Tachyempis adunca Collin, 1933
- Tachyempis agens (Melander, 1910)
- Tachyempis apicis (Williston, 1896)
- Tachyempis calva (Melander, 1910)
- Tachyempis capnodes Melander, 1928
- Tachyempis cinerea Melander, 1928
- Tachyempis dichroa (Bezzi, 1908)
- Tachyempis epibosca Melander, 1928
- Tachyempis gagatina Melander, 1928
- Tachyempis halterata Melander, 1928
- Tachyempis longipennis Melander, 1958
- Tachyempis longispina Melander, 1928
- Tachyempis melanderi Smith, 1962
- Tachyempis nervosa Melander, 1928
- Tachyempis nigra Melander, 1928
- Tachyempis pictipes Melander, 1928
- Tachyempis purpurpalpis Smith, 1962
- Tachyempis ruficornis Melander, 1928
- Tachyempis schilidi Melander, 1928
- Tachyempis simplicior Wheeler & Melander, 1901
- Tachyempis tetrachaeta Melander, 1928
- Tachyempis universalis (Melander, 1910)
- Tachyempis vitripennis (Bezzi, 1908)
