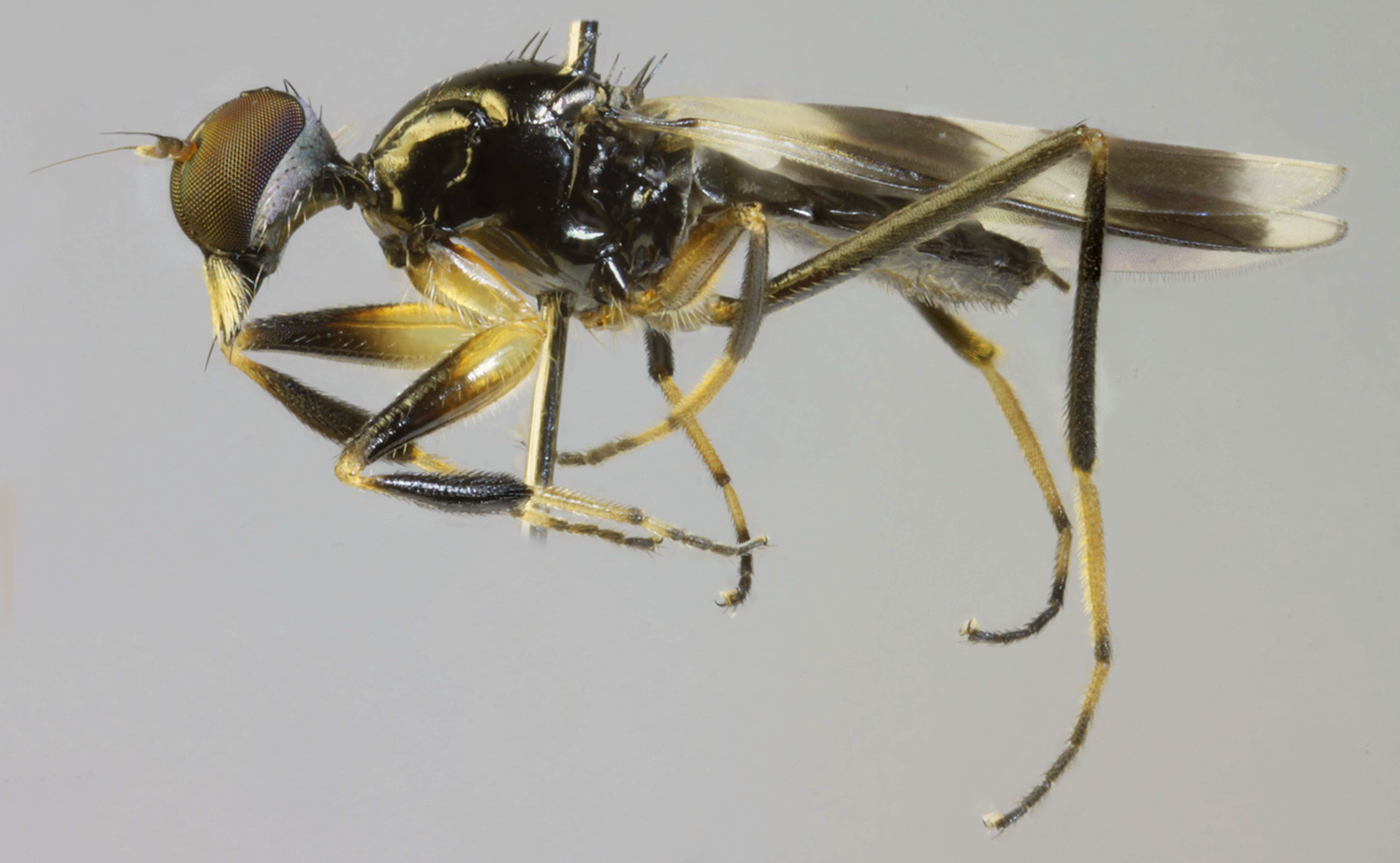
- Tachydromia umbrarum

Scientific classification
- Domain: Eukaryota
- Kingdom: Animalia
- Phylum: Arthropoda
- Class: Insecta
- Order: Diptera
- Family: Hybotidae
- Subfamily: Tachydromiinae
- Tribe: Tachydromiini

= Tachydromiini =

Tribe of flies

Tachydromiini is a tribe of hybotid flies.

== Genera ==
- Dysaletria Loew, 1864
- Platypalpus Macquart, 1828
- Tachydromia Meigen, 1803
- Tachyempis Melander, 1928
- Tachypeza Meigen, 1830
