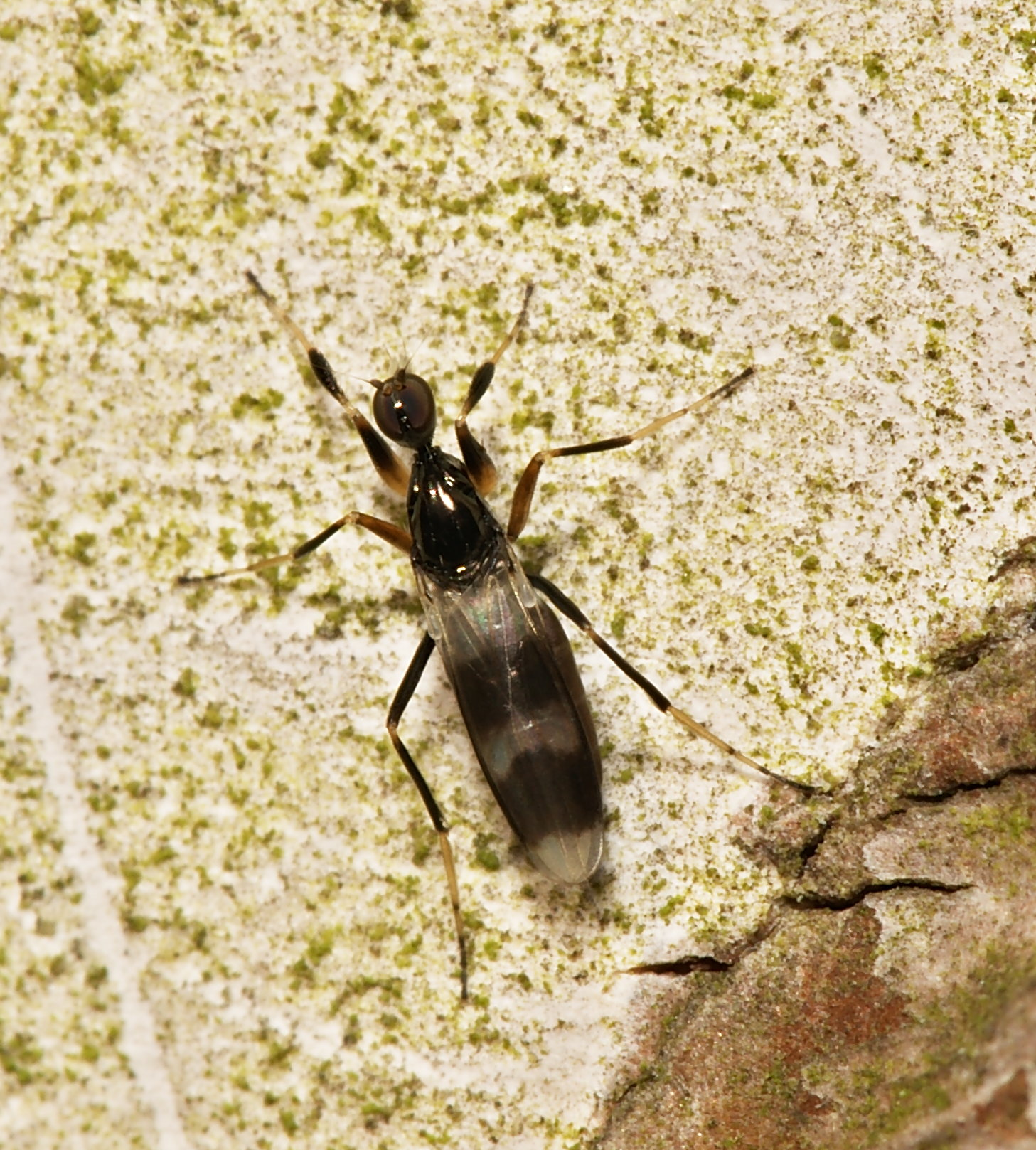
- Tachydromia cf. arrogans

Scientific classification
- Kingdom: Animalia
- Phylum: Arthropoda
- Class: Insecta
- Order: Diptera
- Family: Hybotidae
- Subfamily: Tachydromiinae
- Tribe: Tachydromiini
- Genus: Tachydromia; Meigen, 1803

Type species
- Musca cimicoides Fabricius, 1791

Synonyms
- Coryneta Meigen, 1908; Phoneustica Aldrich, 1905; Phoneutisca Loew, 1863; Sicus Latreille, 1797; Tachidromya Rondani, 1856; Tachidromyia Bigot, 1889; Tachista Loew, 1864; Tachydroma Waltl, 1837; Tachydromya Oken, 1815; Tachydromyia Macquart, 1823; Tachysta Loew, 1864

= Tachydromia =

Genus of flies

Tachydromia is a genus of hybotid flies. It is widespread around the world, with species found essentially everywhere except the polar regions and some remote islands. They are not very diverse in East and Southeast Asia, or in Africa

== Description ==
Tachydromia are minute, slender flies of shining jet-black color, that are almost devoid of hairs and bristles. The globular head bears large eyes with large facets. Three ocelli are present. The two-jointed antennae are short. The vertical, rigid proboscis is shorter than the head. The thorax is longer than broad. The slender legs bear microscopic hairs, but no bristles. The front femora are somewhat thickened. The males of some species have small spines on the middle femora or tibiae beneath. The wings are narrow, with the costa ending at the fourth vein and sometimes thickened beyond the insertion of the first vein. There is no trace of an anal cell present. Some species show one or two dark bands across the wings.

== Species ==
- Tachydromia achterbergi Grootaert & Shamshev, 2009
- Tachydromia acklandi Chvála, 1973
- Tachydromia aemula (Loew, 1864)
- Tachydromia alatauensis Shamshev & Chvála, 2001
- Tachydromia alteropcta (Becker, 1889)
- Tachydromia andreiruizae Grootaert & Shamshev, 2003
- Tachydromia annamensis Grootaert & Shamshev, 2009
- Tachydromia annulimana Meigen, 1822
- Tachydromia apterygon Plant & Deeming, 2006
- Tachydromia arrogans (Linnaeus, 1761)
- Tachydromia basiflava Gu, Zeng, Zhang & Yang, 2021
- Tachydromia bimaculata (Loew, 1863)
- Tachydromia bistigma (Bezzi, 1912)
- Tachydromia borzhomica Shamshev, 1994
- Tachydromia calcanea (Meigen, 1838)
- Tachydromia calcarata (Strobl, 1910)
- Tachydromia carnarvonensis Grootaert & Shamshev, 2011
- Tachydromia carpathica Chvála, 1966
- Tachydromia catalonica (Strobl, 1906)
- Tachydromia caucasica Chvála, 1970
- Tachydromia ciliata Melander, 1910
- Tachydromia collini Shamshev, 1993
- Tachydromia colliniana Shamshev & Chvála, 2001
- Tachydromia connexa Meigen, 1822
- Tachydromia costalis (Roser, 1840)
- Tachydromia crassiseta Gu, Zeng, Zhang & Yang, 2021
- Tachydromia denticulata (Oldenberg, 1912)
- Tachydromia digitiformis Saigusa & Yang, 2003
- Tachydromia diversipes Melander, 1910
- Tachydromia doi Shamshev & Grootaert, 2008
- Tachydromia edenensis Hewitt & Chvála, 2002
- Tachydromia egelata Meunier, 1908
- Tachydromia elbrusensis Chvála, 1970
- Tachydromia enecator Melander, 1902
- Tachydromia excisa (Loew, 1864)
- Tachydromia flavipes Meigen, 1804
- Tachydromia freidbergi Shamshev & Grootaert, 2010
- Tachydromia fuscinervis (Frey, 1915)
- Tachydromia georgiana Shamshev, 1993
- Tachydromia gorodkovi Shamshev, 1993
- Tachydromia guangdongensis Yang & Grootaert, 2006
- Tachydromia gussakovskii Shamshev, 1994
- Tachydromia halidayi (Collin, 1926)
- Tachydromia halterata (Collin, 1926)
- Tachydromia harti Malloch, 1919
- Tachydromia henanensis Saigusa & Yang, 2003
- Tachydromia hirtipes Melander, 1928
- Tachydromia hissarica Shamshev & Chvála, 2001
- Tachydromia incisa (Brunetti, 1913)
- Tachydromia incompleta (Becker, 1900)
- Tachydromia interrupta (Loew, 1864)
- Tachydromia kazakhstanica Shamshev & Chvála, 2001
- Tachydromia kerzhneri Shamshev, 1994
- Tachydromia kovalevi Shamshev, 1993
- Tachydromia latifascipennis Brunetti, 1917
- Tachydromia lilaniensis Smith, 1969
- Tachydromia longyuwanensis Saigusa & Yang, 2003
- Tachydromia lundstroemi (Frey, 1913)
- Tachydromia maculipennis Walker, 1849
- Tachydromia magadanica Shamshev, 1993
- Tachydromia mediasiatica Shamshev & Chvála, 2001
- Tachydromia menglunensis Grootaert, Yang & Shamshev, 2008
- Tachydromia menyangensis Grootaert, Yang & Shamshev, 2008
- Tachydromia microceroides Chvála, 1988
- Tachydromia microptera (Loew, 1864)
- Tachydromia minima (Becker, 1900)
- Tachydromia monaca Melander, 1928
- Tachydromia mongolica Shamshev, 1994
- Tachydromia monocercus Shamshev & Grootaert, 2008
- Tachydromia monserratensis (Strobl, 1906)
- Tachydromia morio (Zetterstedt, 1838)
- Tachydromia mucronata (Collin, 1941)
- Tachydromia nigerrima (Bezzi, 1918)
- Tachydromia obsoleta (Strobl, 1910)
- Tachydromia occipitalis (Collin, 1941)
- Tachydromia ornatipes (Becker, 1890)
- Tachydromia ozerovi Shamshev, 1994
- Tachydromia papuana Grootaert, 1987
- Tachydromia parva Chvála, 1970
- Tachydromia petrabilis Smith, 1969
- Tachydromia phengites Melander, 1928
- Tachydromia postposita Keilbach, 1982
- Tachydromia preapicalis (Collin, 1941)
- Tachydromia productipes (Strobl, 1910)
- Tachydromia pseliophora Melander, 1928
- Tachydromia pseudointerrupta Chvála, 1970
- Tachydromia punctifera (Becker, 1900)
- Tachydromia rhyacophila Chvála, 1995
- Tachydromia rossica Shamshev, 1994
- Tachydromia sabulosa Meigen, 1830
- Tachydromia schnitteri Stark, 1996
- Tachydromia schwarzii Coquillett, 1895
- Tachydromia shatalkini Shamshev, 1994
- Tachydromia sibirica Shamshev, 1993
- Tachydromia simplicissima (Engel, 1938)
- Tachydromia smithi Chvála, 1966
- Tachydromia stackelbergi Shamshev, 1994
- Tachydromia stanislavi Shamshev, 1994
- Tachydromia styriaca (Strobl, 1893)
- Tachydromia subarrogans Kovalev & Chvála, 1985
- Tachydromia tacoma Melander, 1928
- Tachydromia terricola Zetterstedt, 1819
- Tachydromia terricolodies Shamshev & Grootaert, 2005
- Tachydromia thaica Shamshev & Grootaert, 2005
- Tachydromia theobaldi Timon-David, 1944
- Tachydromia tuberculata (Loew, 1864)
- Tachydromia tucumanensis Claps, 1991
- Tachydromia tuvinica Shamshev, 1994
- Tachydromia umbrarum Haliday, 1833
- Tachydromia undulata (Strobl, 1906)
- Tachydromia varipennis Coquillett, 1903
- Tachydromia varzobica Shamshev, 1994
- Tachydromia vietnamensis Grootaert & Shamshev, 2009
- Tachydromia vladimiri Shamshev, 1994
- Tachydromia voracis Meunier, 1908
- Tachydromia vriesi Grootaert & Shamshev, 2009
- Tachydromia woodi (Collin, 1926)
- Tachydromia yunnanensis Grootaert, Yang & Shamshev, 2008
