= Chersodromia =

Scientific classification
- Kingdom: Animalia
- Phylum: Arthropoda
- Class: Insecta
- Order: Diptera
- Family: Hybotidae
- Subfamily: Tachydromiinae
- Tribe: Drapetini
- Genus: Chersodromia; Walker, 1849

Type species
- Tachypeza arenaria Haliday, 1833

Synonyms
- Chersodromia Haliday, 1851; Chersodromyia Bigot, 1891; Coloboneura Melander, 1902; Halsanalotes Becker, 1902; Halsanolotes Smith, 1967; Thinodromia Melander, 1906

Genus of flies

Chersodromia is a genus of flies in the family Hybotidae.

== Species ==
- Chersodromia adriatica Chvála, 1970
- Chersodromia alata (Walker, 1835)
- Chersodromia albopilosa Chvála, 1970
- Chersodromia amaura (Becker, 1902)
- Chersodromia ancilottoi Raffone, Rampini & Scarpa, 1988
- Chersodromia anisopyga Plant, 1995
- Chersodromia arenaria (Haliday, 1833)
- Chersodromia argentina Quate, 1960
- Chersodromia beckeri Melander, 1928
- Chersodromia bulohensis Grootaert & Shamshev, 2012
- Chersodromia bureschi Beschovski, 1973
- Chersodromia cana Melander, 1945
- Chersodromia caucasica Chvála, 1970
- Chersodromia colliniana Frey, 1936
- Chersodromia cursitans (Zetterstedt, 1819)
- Chersodromia curtipennis Collin, 1950
- Chersodromia dissita Collin, 1960
- Chersodromia dominicana Solórzano-Kraemer, Sinclair & Cumming, 2005
- Chersodromia flavicaput Grootaert, Cumming & Shamshev, 2007
- Chersodromia flavipes Chvála, 1977
- Chersodromia flavipyga Grootaert, 1992
- Chersodromia floreana Sinclair & Cumming, 2013
- Chersodromia fluviatilis Chvála, 1995
- Chersodromia foddaiae Raffone, 1994
- Chersodromia galapagensis Sinclair & Cumming, 2013
- Chersodromia gamoviensis Maeda, 2011
- Chersodromia glandula Grootaert & Shamshev, 2012
- Chersodromia gratiosa Becker, 1908
- Chersodromia hackmani Chvála, 1977
- Chersodromia hawaiiensis Melander, 1938
- Chersodromia hirta (Walker, 1835)
- Chersodromia houghii (Melander, 1902)
- Chersodromia incana Walker, 1852
- Chersodromia inchoata (Melander, 1906)
- Chersodromia insignita Melander, 1945
- Chersodromia inusitata (Melander, 1902)
- Chersodromia isabela Sinclair & Cumming, 2013
- Chersodromia isabellae Grootaert & Shamshev, 2010
- Chersodromia italica Chvála, 1970
- Chersodromia kamtchatkiana Chvála, 1970
- Chersodromia leleji Maeda, 2011
- Chersodromia longicornis Curran, 1931
- Chersodromia luanchuanensis Yang, An & Gao, 2002
- Chersodromia madelinae Arnaud, 1975
- Chersodromia magacetes Melander, 1945
- Chersodromia malaysiana Grootaert & Shamshev, 2012
- Chersodromia mediterranea Chvála, 1970
- Chersodromia micra Grootaert, 1992
- Chersodromia milanchvalai Beschovski, 1973
- Chersodromia mohican Maeda, 2011
- Chersodromia nana (Coquillett, 1903)
- Chersodromia neocurtipennis Beschovski, 1974
- Chersodromia nigripennis Shamshev & Grootaert, 2005
- Chersodromia nigripyga Grootaert, 1992
- Chersodromia nigrosetosa Chvála, 1970
- Chersodromia nubifera (Coquillett, 1899)
- Chersodromia obscura Grootaert, Cumming & Shamshev, 2007
- Chersodromia oraria Collin, 1966
- Chersodromia orlandinii Raffone, 1984
- Chersodromia parallela (Melander, 1928)
- Chersodromia pasir Grootaert & Shamshev, 2012
- Chersodromia pontica Chvála, 1970
- Chersodromia pseudoadriatica Raffone, 2004
- Chersodromia pseudohirta Chvála, 1970
- Chersodromia ratti Raffone, 1987
- Chersodromia singaporensis Shamshev & Grootaert, 2005
- Chersodromia speculifera Walker, 1852
- Chersodromia stenopsis Maeda, 2011
- Chersodromia suda Plant, 1995
- Chersodromia sylvicola Grootaert & Shamshev, 2012
- Chersodromia tiomanensis Grootaert & Shamshev, 2012
- Chersodromia tschirnhausi Stark, 1995
- Chersodromia yamanei Maeda, 2011
- Chersodromia zelandica Rogers, 1982
