= Lactistomyia =

Scientific classification
- Kingdom: Animalia
- Phylum: Arthropoda
- Class: Insecta
- Order: Diptera
- Family: Hybotidae
- Subfamily: Hybotinae
- Genus: Lactistomyia; Melander, 1902

Type species
- Lactistomyia insolita Melander, 1902

Genus of flies

Lactistomyia is a genus of flies in the family Hybotidae.

== Species ==
- Lactistomyia hyalina Bezzi, 1909
- Lactistomyia insolita Melander, 1902
- Lactistomyia lepida Ale-Rocha, 2008
- Lactistomyia mammifera Curran, 1931
- Lactistomyia minuta Ale-Rocha, 2008
- Lactistomyia nigripes Curran, 1931
- Lactistomyia panamensis Curran, 1931
- Lactistomyia paranaensis Ale-Rocha, 2008
- Lactistomyia polita Melander, 1928
- Lactistomyia pulchra Ale-Rocha, 2008
- Lactistomyia serrata Bezzi, 1909
- Lactistomyia tuberculata Ale-Rocha, 2008
