= Lamachella =

Scientific classification
- Kingdom: Animalia
- Phylum: Arthropoda
- Class: Insecta
- Order: Diptera
- Family: Hybotidae
- Subfamily: Hybotinae
- Genus: Lamachella; Melander, 1928

Type species
- Lamachella univittata Melander, 1928

Genus of flies

Lamachella is a genus of flies in the family Hybotidae.

== Species ==
- Lamachella germanica Chvála & Stark, 1997
- Lamachella maculata Smith, 1969
- Lamachella marginalis Smith, 1969
- Lamachella namwamba Garrett Jones, 1940
- Lamachella univittata Melander, 1928
