= Euthyneura (fly) =

Scientific classification
- Kingdom: Animalia
- Phylum: Arthropoda
- Class: Insecta
- Order: Diptera
- Family: Hybotidae
- Subfamily: Oedaleinae
- Genus: Euthyneura; Macquart, 1836

Type species
- Euthyneura myrtilli Macquart, 1836

Synonyms
- Euthynevra Agassiz, 1846

Genus of flies

Euthyneura is a genus of flies in the family Hybotidae. The known range of Euthyneura myrtilli extended to Ireland in counties Fermanagh and Antrim in 2007.

== Species ==
- Euthyneura abnormis Saigusa & Yang, 2003
- Euthyneura aerea Frey, 1953
- Euthyneura albipennis (Zetterstedt, 1842)
- Euthyneura aperta Melander, 1902
- Euthyneura argyria Melander, 1928
- Euthyneura bucinator Melander, 1902
- Euthyneura crocata (Coquillett, 1900)
- Euthyneura gyllenhali (Zetterstedt, 1838)
- Euthyneura halidayi Collin, 1926
- Euthyneura inermis (Becker, 1910)
- Euthyneura matura Melander, 1928
- Euthyneura myricae Haliday, 1851
- Euthyneura myrtilli Macquart, 1836
- Euthyneura spinipes Melander, 1928
- Euthyneura stigmata Saigusa & Yang, 2003
- Euthyneura zaitsevi Shamshev & Kustov, 2012
