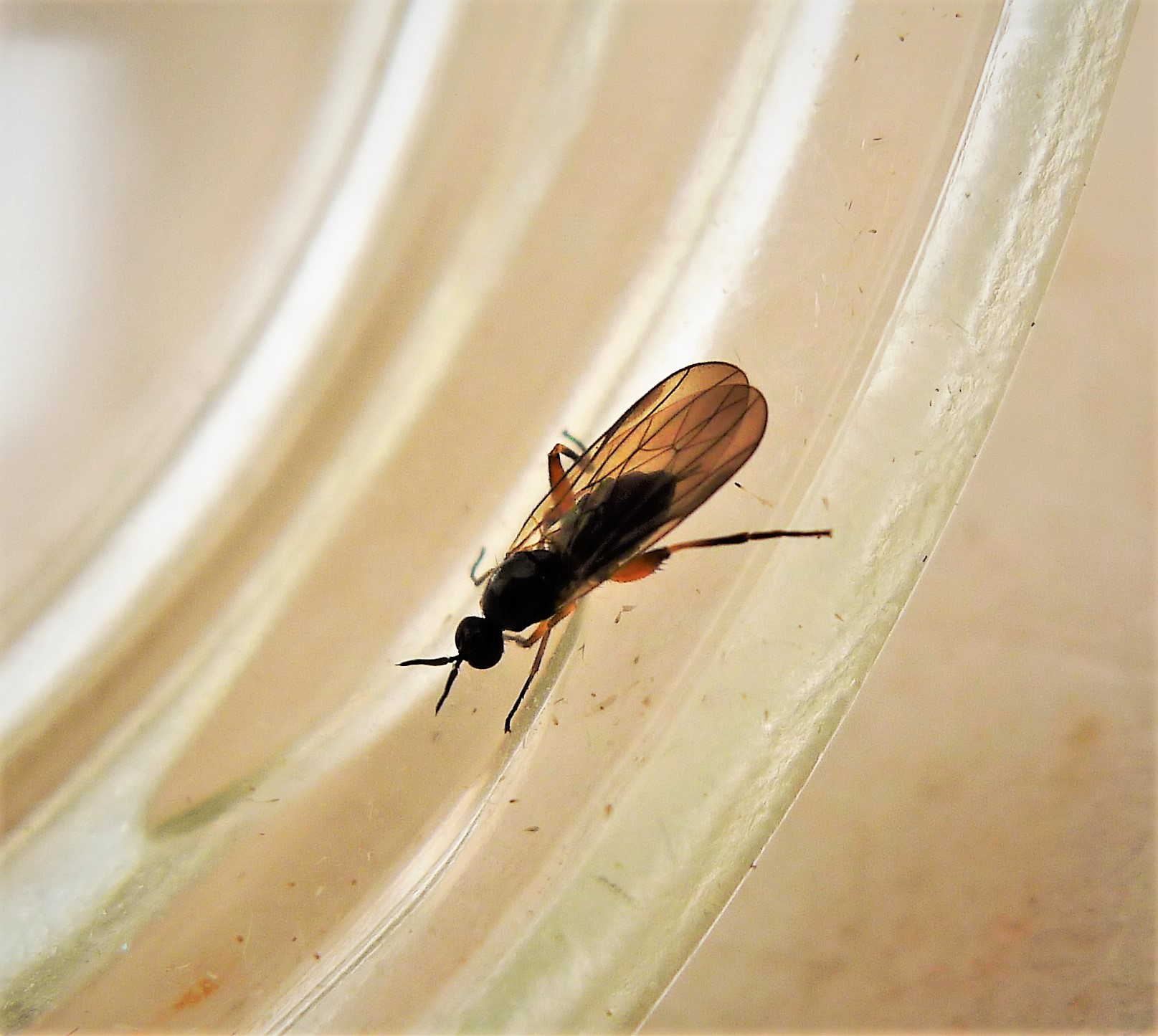
- Oedalea sp

Scientific classification
- Kingdom: Animalia
- Phylum: Arthropoda
- Clade: Pancrustacea
- Class: Insecta
- Order: Diptera
- Family: Hybotidae
- Subfamily: Oedaleinae; Chvala, 1983

= Oedaleinae =

Subfamily of flies

Oedaleinae is a subfamily of hybotid flies.

== Genera ==
- Allanthalia Melander, 1927
- Anthalia Zetterstedt, 1838
- Euthyneura Macquart, 1836
- Oedalea Meigen, 1820
