= Neohybos =

Scientific classification
- Kingdom: Animalia
- Phylum: Arthropoda
- Class: Insecta
- Order: Diptera
- Family: Hybotidae
- Subfamily: Hybotinae
- Genus: Neohybos; Carvalho, 2003

Type species
- Hybos luridus Bezzi, 1909

Genus of flies

Neohybos is a genus of flies in the family Hybotidae.

== Species ==
- Neohybos aberrans Ale-Rocha, 2017
- Neohybos adustus Ale-Rocha, 2017
- Neohybos annulatus Ale-Rocha, 2017
- Neohybos arcuatus Ale-Rocha, 2017
- Neohybos bicolor Ale-Rocha, 2007
- Neohybos brunnescens Ale-Rocha, 2007
- Neohybos cinereus Ale-Rocha & Rafael, 2004
- Neohybos colombiensis Ale-Rocha, 2007
- Neohybos cooperi Ale-Rocha, 2007
- Neohybos cupreus Ale-Rocha, 2007
- Neohybos derodactylus (Melander, 1928)
- Neohybos elegans Ale-Rocha, 2007
- Neohybos elongatus Ale-Rocha, 2017
- Neohybos fuliginosus Ale-Rocha, 2016
- Neohybos fuscipes Ale-Rocha, 2007
- Neohybos globosus Ale-Rocha, 2016
- Neohybos hallexus (Smith, 1963)
- Neohybos halteralis (Bezzi, 1909)
- Neohybos hirsutus Ale-Rocha, 2017
- Neohybos izabelensis Ale-Rocha, 2017
- Neohybos lautus Ale-Rocha, 2017
- Neohybos leptogaster (Melander, 1928)
- Neohybos longicornis Ale-Rocha & Rafael, 2004
- Neohybos longiventris Ale-Rocha, 2007
- Neohybos luridus (Bezzi, 1909)
- Neohybos neblinensis Ale-Rocha, 2017
- Neohybos pectinatus Ale-Rocha, 2017
- Neohybos pruinosus Ale-Rocha & Rafael, 2004
- Neohybos ramosus Ale-Rocha, 2017
- Neohybos rossi Ale-Rocha, 2007
- Neohybos rostratus Ale-Rocha, 2016
- Neohybos schlingeri Ale-Rocha, 2007
- Neohybos serratus Ale-Rocha, 2016
- Neohybos setosus Ale-Rocha & Rafael, 2004
- Neohybos spinosus Ale-Rocha, 2016
- Neohybos tenuis Ale-Rocha, 2007
