= Allanthalia =

Scientific classification
- Kingdom: Animalia
- Phylum: Arthropoda
- Class: Insecta
- Order: Diptera
- Family: Hybotidae
- Subfamily: Oedaleinae
- Genus: Allanthalia; Melander, 1928

Type species
- Anthalia pallida Zetterstedt, 1838

Genus of flies

Allanthalia is a genus of flies in the family Hybotidae.

== Species ==
- Allanthalia pallida (Zetterstedt, 1838)
