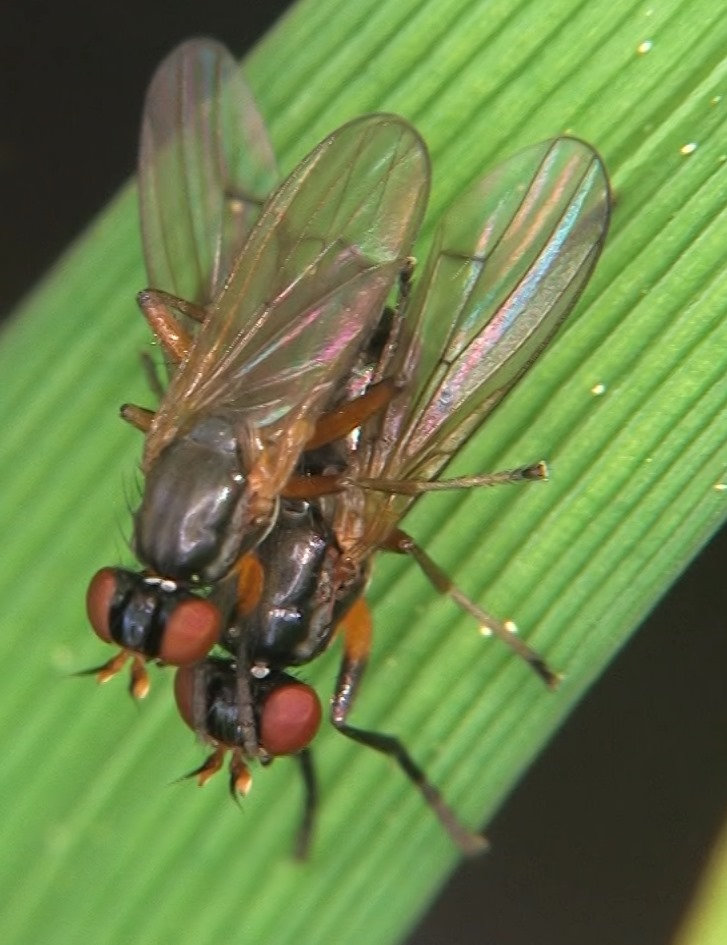
- Anticheta atriseta

Scientific classification
- Domain: Eukaryota
- Kingdom: Animalia
- Phylum: Arthropoda
- Class: Insecta
- Order: Diptera
- Family: Sciomyzidae
- Subfamily: Sciomyzinae
- Tribe: Tetanocerini
- Genus: Anticheta; Rondani, 1856

Type species
- Tetanocera vittata Haliday, 1839

= Anticheta =

Genus of flies

Anticheta is a genus of flies in the family Sciomyzidae, the marsh flies or snail-killing flies.

== Species ==
- Subgenus Anticheta Haliday, 1839

- A. analis (Meigen, 1830)
- A. atriseta (Loew, 1849)
- A. borealis Foote, 1961)
- A. brevipennis (Zetterstedt, 1846)
- A. canadensis (Curran, 1923)
- A. fulva Steyskal, 1960
- A. johnsoni (Cresson, 1920)
- A. melanosoma Melander, 1920
- A. nigra Karl, 1921
- A. obliviosa Enderlein, 1939
- A. robiginosa Melander, 1920
- A. shatalkini Vikhrev, 2008
- A. testacea Melander, 1920
- A. vernalis Fisher & Orth, 1971

- Subgenus Paranticheta Enderlein, 1936

- A. bisetosa Hendel, 1902
