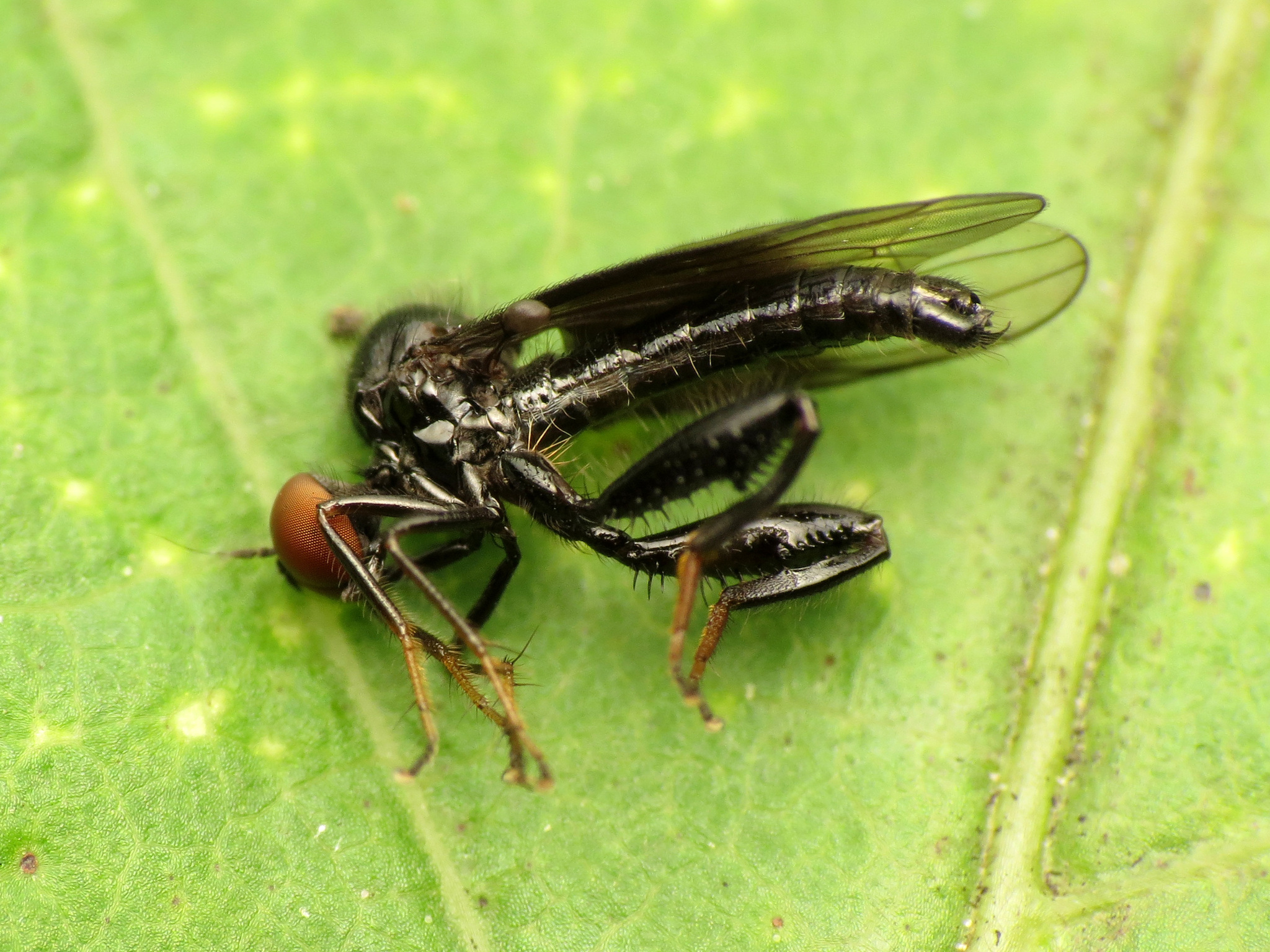
- Euhybus purpureus

Scientific classification
- Kingdom: Animalia
- Phylum: Arthropoda
- Class: Insecta
- Order: Diptera
- Family: Hybotidae
- Subfamily: Hybotinae
- Genus: Euhybus; Coquillett, 1895

Type species
- Hybos purpureus Walker, 1849

Synonyms
- Euhybos Curran, 1934; Euhybos Melander, 1902

= Euhybus =

Genus of flies

Euhybus is a genus of flies in the family Hybotidae.

== Species ==
- Euhybus agens Curran, 1931
- Euhybus algens Curran, 1931
- Euhybus amazonicus Ale-Rocha, 2002
- Euhybus antiquus Curran, 1931
- Euhybus ardopeodes Melander, 1928
- Euhybus bakeri Wheeler & Melander, 1901
- Euhybus baropeodes Melander, 1928
- Euhybus coquilletti Melander, 1928
- Euhybus crassipes (Fabricius, 1805)
- Euhybus cuspidatus Melander, 1928
- Euhybus dimidiatus (Walker, 1852)
- Euhybus dinopus Melander, 1928
- Euhybus donato Curran, 1931
- Euhybus dubius Ale-Rocha, 2002
- Euhybus duplex (Walker, 1849)
- Euhybus electus Melander, 1902
- Euhybus eurypterus Bezzi, 1909
- Euhybus fuscipennis Ale-Rocha, 2004
- Euhybus genitivus Melander, 1928
- Euhybus grandis Ale-Rocha, 2004
- Euhybus gryphus Melander, 1928
- Euhybus hyalopterus Bezzi, 1905
- Euhybus ikedai Ale-Rocha, 2002
- Euhybus latipennis Bezzi, 1909
- Euhybus leptoneura Melander, 1928
- Euhybus loewi Wheeler & Melander, 1901
- Euhybus longiseta Wang, Li & Yang, 2013
- Euhybus makauriensis Smith, 1963
- Euhybus martiniensis Ale-Rocha & Rafael, 2004
- Euhybus metatarsalis Melander, 1928
- Euhybus nanlingensis Yang & Grootaert, 2007
- Euhybus negundus Curran, 1931
- Euhybus niger Ale-Rocha, 2004
- Euhybus nigripes Melander, 1928
- Euhybus nigritarsis Wang, Li & Yang, 2013
- Euhybus novoaripuanensis Ale-Rocha, 2004
- Euhybus ocreatus Melander, 1928
- Euhybus panamensis Curran, 1931
- Euhybus pectinifemur Ale-Rocha, 2016
- Euhybus piceus (Wiedemann, 1830)
- Euhybus pilosiformis Bezzi, 1909
- Euhybus pilosus Schiner, 1868
- Euhybus purpureus (Walker, 1849)
- Euhybus reduncus Ale-Rocha, 2004
- Euhybus richardsi Smith, 1963
- Euhybus schildi Melander, 1928
- Euhybus setulosus Ale-Rocha, 2002
- Euhybus simplex Melander, 1928
- Euhybus smarti Smith, 1963
- Euhybus smithi Wheeler & Melander, 1901
- Euhybus sordipes Melander, 1928
- Euhybus spiniger Melander, 1928
- Euhybus spinosus Curran, 1928
- Euhybus stigmaticus Schiner, 1868
- Euhybus strumaticus Melander, 1928
- Euhybus symmetricus Ale-Rocha, 2002
- Euhybus tabascensis Wheeler & Melander, 1901
- Euhybus taiwanensis Liu, Li & Yang, 2011
- Euhybus thrixothrix Melander, 1928
- Euhybus tomentosus Ale-Rocha, 2004
- Euhybus triplex (Walker, 1849)
- Euhybus verrucicrus Melander, 1928
- Euhybus vitripennis Curran, 1931
- Euhybus xui Yang & Grootaert, 2007
- Euhybus yucatanus Wheeler & Melander, 1901
