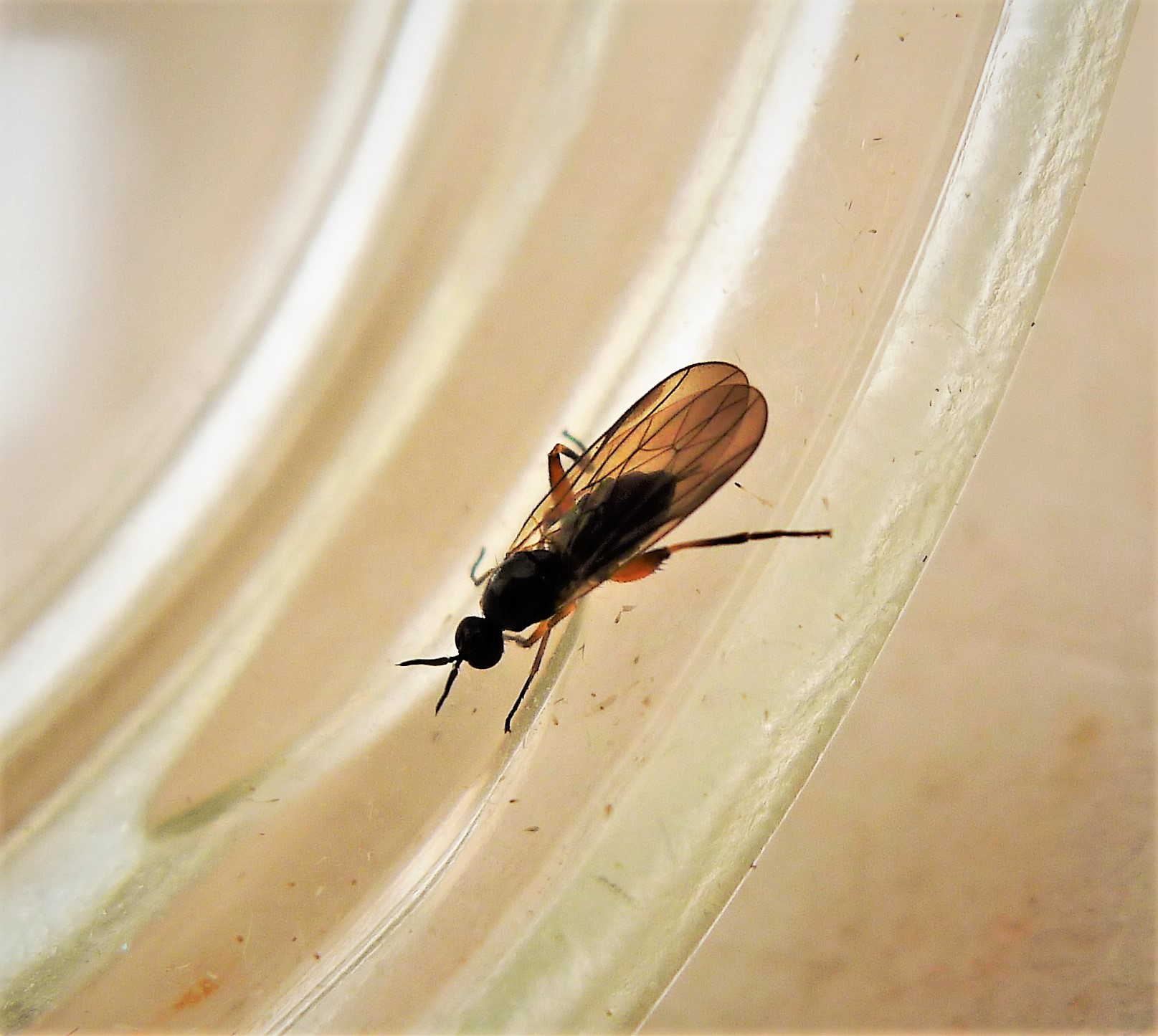
- Oedalea sp.

Scientific classification
- Kingdom: Animalia
- Phylum: Arthropoda
- Clade: Pancrustacea
- Class: Insecta
- Order: Diptera
- Family: Hybotidae
- Subfamily: Oedaleinae
- Genus: Oedalea; Meigen, 1820

Type species
- Empis hybotina Fallén, 1816

Synonyms
- Oedalia Meigen, 1838

= Oedalea =

Genus of flies

Oedalea is a genus of flies in the family Hybotidae.

== Species ==
- Oedalea apicalis Loew, 1859
- Oedalea astylata Melander, 1928
- Oedalea austroholmgreni Chvála, 1981
- Oedalea baiyunshanensis Saigusa & Yang, 2003
- Oedalea bracata Rondani, 1856
- Oedalea flavipes Zetterstedt, 1842
- Oedalea freyi Chvála, 1983
- Oedalea holmgreni Zetterstedt, 1852
- Oedalea hybotina (Fallén, 1816)
- Oedalea kowarzi Chvála, 1981
- Oedalea lanceolata Melander, 1928
- Oedalea linzhiensis Zeng, Lin & Yang, 2022
- Oedalea longicornis Frey, 1953
- Oedalea montana Chvála, 1981
- Oedalea nanlingensis Yang & Grootaert, 2006
- Oedalea ohioensis Melander, 1902
- Oedalea oriunda Collin, 1961
- Oedalea portugalica Barták & Grootaert, 2021
- Oedalea pruinosa Coquillett, 1903
- Oedalea putida (Meunier, 1908)
- Oedalea ringdahli Chvála, 1983
- Oedalea robusta Meunier, 1908
- Oedalea stigmatella Zetterstedt, 1842
- Oedalea testacea Melander, 1928
- Oedalea tibialis Macquart, 1828
- Oedalea tristis Scholtz, 1851
- Oedalea vietnamensis Shamshev, 2020
- Oedalea wenliangi Zeng, Lin & Yang, 2022
- Oedalea wulingshana Zeng, Lin & Yang, 2022
- Oedalea yangi Zeng, Lin & Yang, 2022
- Oedalea zetterstedti Collin, 1926
