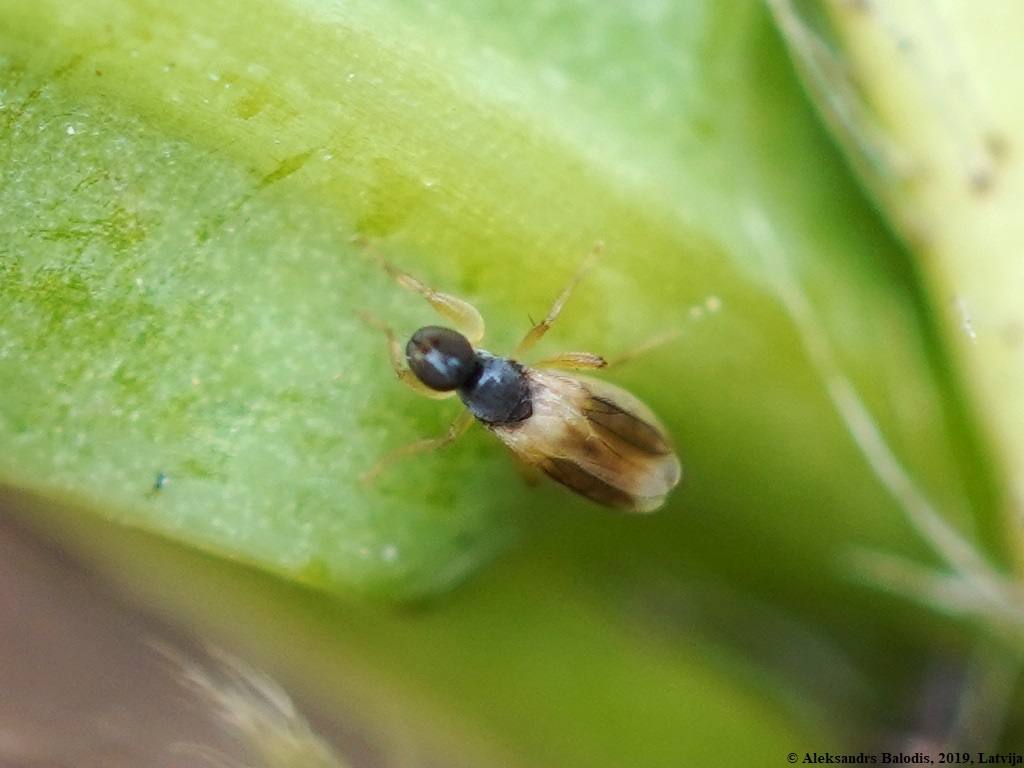
- Image of a Stilpon

Scientific classification
- Kingdom: Animalia
- Phylum: Arthropoda
- Class: Insecta
- Order: Diptera
- Family: Hybotidae
- Subfamily: Tachydromiinae
- Tribe: Drapetini
- Genus: Stilpon; Loew, 1859

Type species
- Tachydromia graminum Fallén, 1815

Synonyms
- Agatachys Meigen, 1830

= Stilpon (fly) =

Genus of flies

Stilpon is a genus of flies in the family Hybotidae.

== Species ==
- Stilpon angkorensis Shamshev, 2006
- Stilpon appendiculatum Frey, 1936
- Stilpon arcuatum Grootaert & Shamshev, 2012
- Stilpon campestris Cumming, 1992
- Stilpon chillcotti Cumming, 1992
- Stilpon corsicanus Grootaert & Shamshev, 2003
- Stilpon crassinervis Shamshev & Grootaert, 2004
- Stilpon ctenistes Cumming, 1992
- Stilpon curvipes Melander, 1928
- Stilpon delamarei (Séguy, 1950)
- Stilpon divergens Smith, 1965
- Stilpon freidbergi Shamshev, Grootaert & Yang, 2005
- Stilpon goesi Shamshev, 2006
- Stilpon graminum (Fallén, 1815)
- Stilpon gussakovskii Shamshev, 2005
- Stilpon intermedius Raffone, 1994
- Stilpon isaanensis Shamshev & Grootaert, 2004
- Stilpon khorngkeun Shamshev & Grootaert, 2004
- Stilpon laawae Shamshev & Grootaert, 2004
- Stilpon lek Shamshev & Grootaert, 2004
- Stilpon lekkwar Shamshev & Grootaert, 2004
- Stilpon leleupi Smith, 1969
- Stilpon limitaris Cumming, 1992
- Stilpon lomaense Raffone, 1986
- Stilpon lunatus (Walker, 1852)
- Stilpon machadoi Smith, 1965
- Stilpon malayensis Shamshev & Grootaert, 2004
- Stilpon mexicanus Solórzano-Kraemer, Sinclair & Cumming, 2005
- Stilpon monospinatus Shamshev & Grootaert, 2004
- Stilpon moroccensis Grootaert & Zouhair, 2021
- Stilpon nanlingensis Shamshev, Grootaert & Yang, 2005
- Stilpon neesoonensis Grootaert & Shamshev, 2012
- Stilpon nhamdam Shamshev & Grootaert, 2004
- Stilpon nhamyaaw Shamshev & Grootaert, 2004
- Stilpon nigripennis Grootaert & Shamshev, 2012
- Stilpon nubilus Collin, 1926
- Stilpon paludosus (Perris, 1852)
- Stilpon paradoxus Shamshev & Grootaert, 2004
- Stilpon pauciseta Melander, 1928
- Stilpon pectiniger Melander, 1902
- Stilpon pilomus Cumming, 1992
- Stilpon seeluang Shamshev & Grootaert, 2004
- Stilpon singaporensis Grootaert & Shamshev, 2012
- Stilpon spinicercus Shamshev & Grootaert, 2004
- Stilpon spinipes Melander, 1928
- Stilpon sublunatus Collin, 1961
- Stilpon subnubilus Chvála, 1988
- Stilpon taksin Shamshev & Grootaert, 2004
- Stilpon tribulosus Cumming, 1992
- Stilpon trilobatus Shamshev & Grootaert, 2004
- Stilpon tyconyx Cumming, 1992
- Stilpon varipes Loew, 1862
- Stilpon vockerothi Cumming, 1992
- Stilpon weilingae Grootaert & Shamshev, 2012
- Stilpon wirthi Cumming, 1992
- Stilpon yai Shamshev & Grootaert, 2004
