= Allodromia =

Scientific classification
- Kingdom: Animalia
- Phylum: Arthropoda
- Class: Insecta
- Order: Diptera
- Family: Hybotidae
- Subfamily: Tachydromiinae
- Tribe: Drapetini
- Genus: Allodromia; Smith, 1962

Type species
- Allodromia brunnea Smith, 1962

Genus of flies

Allodromia is a genus of flies in the family Hybotidae.

== Species ==
- Allodromia brunnea Smith, 1962
- Allodromia longiseta Chillcott, 1983
- Allodromia multisetosa Chillcott, 1983
- Allodromia testacea (Melander, 1928)
- Allodromia villosa Chillcott, 1983
- Allodromia wirthi Chillcott, 1983
