= Micrempis =

Scientific classification
- Kingdom: Animalia
- Phylum: Arthropoda
- Class: Insecta
- Order: Diptera
- Family: Hybotidae
- Subfamily: Tachydromiinae
- Tribe: Drapetini
- Genus: Micrempis; Melander, 1928

Type species
- Micrempis nana Melander, 1928

Genus of flies

Micrempis is a genus of flies in the family Hybotidae.

== Species ==
- Micrempis anatolica Chillcott, 1983
- Micrempis argyropalpa (Bezzi, 1904)
- Micrempis arnasoni Chillcott, 1983
- Micrempis bomboxynon Chillcott, 1983
- Micrempis brasiliensis Chillcott, 1983
- Micrempis brevis Solórzano-Kraemer, Sinclair & Cumming, 2005
- Micrempis carpofusca Chillcott & Teskey, 1983
- Micrempis costata Chillcott & Teskey, 1983
- Micrempis curviradius (Smith, 1962)
- Micrempis dominicensis Chillcott, 1983
- Micrempis eocenica (Meunier, 1908)
- Micrempis flava Chillcott, 1983
- Micrempis flavicrus Chillcott & Teskey, 1983
- Micrempis fuscipes (Bezzi, 1912)
- Micrempis lutescens (Bezzi, 1904)
- Micrempis melina Chillcott, 1983
- Micrempis mexicana Chillcott, 1983
- Micrempis millepalmae Chillcott, 1983
- Micrempis mimica Chillcott, 1983
- Micrempis minuta (Melander, 1902)
- Micrempis nana Melander, 1928
- Micrempis nitidigena Chillcott & Teskey, 1983
- Micrempis obliqua Melander, 1928
- Micrempis oculiseta Chillcott & Teskey, 1983
- Micrempis plaumanni Chillcott, 1983
- Micrempis pseudopalmae Chillcott, 1983
- Micrempis richardsi Chillcott, 1983
- Micrempis setifrons (Bezzi, 1904)
- Micrempis suspiciosa Meunier, 1908
- Micrempis varipes Melander, 1928
