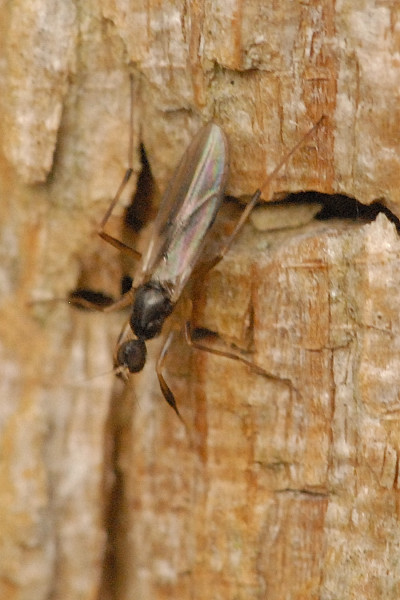
- Tachypeza nubila

Scientific classification
- Kingdom: Animalia
- Phylum: Arthropoda
- Class: Insecta
- Order: Diptera
- Family: Hybotidae
- Subfamily: Tachydromiinae
- Tribe: Tachydromiini
- Genus: Tachypeza; Meigen, 1830

Type species
- Tachydromia nervosa Meigen, 1822

Synonyms
- Ariasella Collado, 1923; Pieltainia Arias, 1919; Tachipeza Rondani, 1856; Tachpyeza Evenhuis, 1994

= Tachypeza =

Genus of flies

Tachypeza is a genus of flies in the family Hybotidae.

== Species ==
- Tachypeza annamensis (Grootaert & Shamshev, 2009)
- Tachypeza annularis Melander, 1928
- Tachypeza australiensis (Grootaert & Shamshev, 2011)
- Tachypeza bickeli (Grootaert & Shamshev, 2011)
- Tachypeza binotata Melander, 1928
- Tachypeza brachialis (Melander, 1902)
- Tachypeza clavipes Loew, 1864
- Tachypeza corticalis (Melander, 1902)
- Tachypeza cummingi Shamshev & Grootaert, 2018
- Tachypeza discifera Melander, 1928
- Tachypeza distans Melander, 1928
- Tachypeza dolorosa Melander, 1928
- Tachypeza excisa Melander, 1928
- Tachypeza fenestrata (Say, 1823)
- Tachypeza fennica Tuomikoski, 1932
- Tachypeza fuscipennis (Fallén, 1815)
- Tachypeza heeri Zetterstedt, 1838
- Tachypeza hispanica Chvála, 1981
- Tachypeza humeralis Melander, 1928
- Tachypeza iberica (Arias, 1919)
- Tachypeza inusta (Melander, 1902)
- Tachypeza luang (Shamshev & Grootaert, 2005)
- Tachypeza malaysiensis (Shamshev & Grootaert, 2009)
- Tachypeza nigra Yang & Yang, 1997
- Tachypeza nubila (Meigen, 1804)
- Tachypeza ocellata (Shamshev & Grootaert, 2008)
- Tachypeza pahangiensis (Shamshev & Grootaert, 2009)
- Tachypeza pandellei (Séguy, 1941)
- Tachypeza phanensis (Shamshev & Grootaert, 2008)
- Tachypeza phu (Shamshev & Grootaert, 2008)
- Tachypeza pieltaini (Gil Collado, 1936)
- Tachypeza portaecola (Walker, 1849)
- Tachypeza postica (Walker, 1857)
- Tachypeza primitiva Melander, 1949
- Tachypeza pruinosa Coquillett, 1903
- Tachypeza rostrata Loew, 1864
- Tachypeza sachem (Melander, 1928)
- Tachypeza semiaptera (Gil Collado, 1923)
- Tachypeza sericeipalpis Frey, 1913
- Tachypeza stuckenbergi (Shamshev & Grootaert, 2010)
- Tachypeza tanaisense Kovalev & Chvála, 1975
- Tachypeza tigeri (Shamshev & Grootaert, 2008)
- Tachypeza truncorum (Fallén, 1815)
- Tachypeza venosa (Stephens, 1829)
- Tachypeza vietnamensis Grootaert & Shamshev, 2009
- Tachypeza vriesi Grootaert & Shamshev, 2009
- Tachypeza winthemi Zetterstedt, 1838
- Tachypeza yinyang Papp & Földvári, 2002
