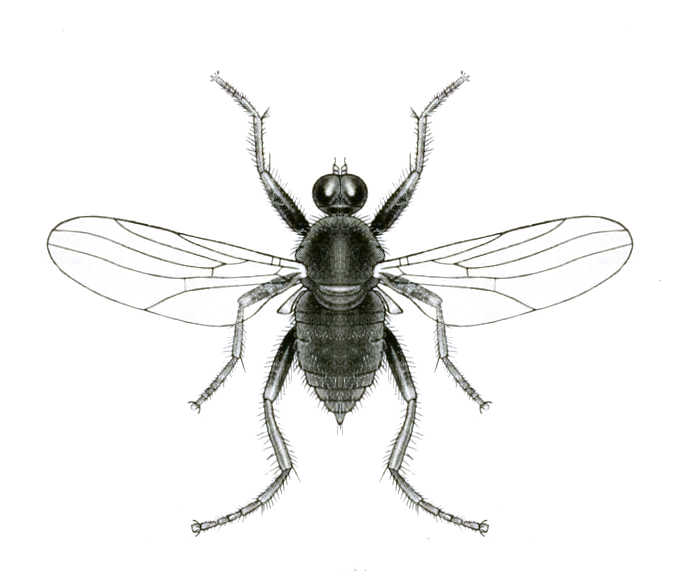
- Drapetis brevior

Scientific classification
- Kingdom: Animalia
- Phylum: Arthropoda
- Class: Insecta
- Order: Diptera
- Family: Hybotidae
- Subfamily: Tachydromiinae
- Tribe: Drapetini
- Genus: Drapetis; Meigen, 1822

Type species
- Drapetis exilis Meigen, 1822

= Drapetis =

Genus of flies

Drapetis is a genus of flies in the family Hybotidae.

== Species ==
- Drapetis abbreviata Smith, 1962
- Drapetis abdominenotata Senior-White, 1922
- Drapetis acrodactyla Melander, 1928
- Drapetis acuminata Smith, 1962
- Drapetis adamsi Smith, 1969
- Drapetis adelomedos Greenwalt, 2019
- Drapetis aenescens Wiedemann, 1830
- Drapetis alimacula Rogers, 1983
- Drapetis aliternigra Melander, 1918
- Drapetis angustata Collin, 1922
- Drapetis angustifacies Raffone, 1994
- Drapetis antennata (Becker, 1909)
- Drapetis apicalis Smith, 1969
- Drapetis arcuata Loew, 1859
- Drapetis arenaria Smith, 1969
- Drapetis aristalis (Melander, 1918)
- Drapetis armipes Bezzi, 1909
- Drapetis arnaudi Rogers, 1989
- Drapetis assimilis (Fallén, 1815)
- Drapetis atrinervalis Rogers, 1983
- Drapetis bacis (Walker, 1849)
- Drapetis bakau Grootaert & Shamshev, 2012
- Drapetis barueri Smith, 1962
- Drapetis basalis Bezzi, 1904
- Drapetis bicaudata Melander, 1928
- Drapetis bicolor Collin, 1949
- Drapetis bicoloripes Brunetti, 1913
- Drapetis binotata Meijere, 1911
- Drapetis biseticauda Smith, 1963
- Drapetis bispina Melander, 1918
- Drapetis biuncinata Melander, 1928
- Drapetis boergei Chvála, 1971
- Drapetis brevicula Melander, 1928
- Drapetis brevior Brunetti, 1913
- Drapetis brevis Meunier, 1908
- Drapetis bruscellensis Grootaert, 2016
- Drapetis calcarifera Bezzi, 1907
- Drapetis calva Melander, 1918
- Drapetis capensis Smith, 1967
- Drapetis cerina Rogers, 1989
- Drapetis cockerelli Smith, 1969
- Drapetis coei Smith, 1965
- Drapetis comata Melander, 1918
- Drapetis completa Kovalev, 1972
- Drapetis convergens Collin, 1926
- Drapetis cuneipennis (Melander, 1918)
- Drapetis deceptor Curran, 1929
- Drapetis decolorata Meunier, 1908
- Drapetis decoratum Meunier, 1908
- Drapetis depressifrons Smith, 1969
- Drapetis destituta Rogers, 1989
- Drapetis digitata Yang & Grootaert, 2006
- Drapetis dingaani Smith, 1969
- Drapetis discoidalis (Bezzi, 1904)
- Drapetis dispar (Adams, 1905)
- Drapetis disparilis Frey, 1936
- Drapetis dissentis Solórzano-Kraemer, Sinclair & Cumming, 2005
- Drapetis distans Bezzi, 1904
- Drapetis distincta Senior-White, 1922
- Drapetis divergens Loew, 1872
- Drapetis diversa Melander, 1918
- Drapetis dividua Melander, 1902
- Drapetis dorsiseta Melander, 1918
- Drapetis elevatus (Bezzi, 1908)
- Drapetis elongata Yang & Grootaert, 2006
- Drapetis ephippiata (Fallén, 1815)
- Drapetis exilis Meigen, 1822
- Drapetis exul (Osten Sacken, 1882)
- Drapetis fascifemorata Brunetti, 1913
- Drapetis femoralis Wheeler & Melander, 1901
- Drapetis femorata Melander, 1918
- Drapetis flavicollis Becker, 1909
- Drapetis flavicornis Melander, 1918
- Drapetis flavicoxalis Frey, 1936
- Drapetis flavida Williston, 1896
- Drapetis flavipes Macquart, 1834
- Drapetis fortis Bezzi, 1909
- Drapetis fulvithorax (Wulp, 1897)
- Drapetis ghesquierei Collart, 1934
- Drapetis gilvipes Loew, 1872
- Drapetis hiatus Whittington, 1993
- Drapetis hirsuticercis Schnitter, Trost & Wallaschek, 2003
- Drapetis hirsutiitibia Meijere, 1914
- Drapetis hirsutipes Collin, 1960
- Drapetis hottentoti Smith, 1969
- Drapetis hutan Grootaert & Shamshev, 2012
- Drapetis hutsoni Smith, 1967
- Drapetis incompleta Collin, 1926
- Drapetis inermis Melander, 1918
- Drapetis infitialis Collin, 1961
- Drapetis inflexa Melander, 1918
- Drapetis infumata Melander, 1918
- Drapetis ingrica Kovalev, 1972
- Drapetis inquilina Séguy, 1945
- Drapetis intermedia Smith, 1962
- Drapetis kala Smith, 1965
- Drapetis kerteszi Bezzi, 1912
- Drapetis kholsa Smith, 1965
- Drapetis knutsoni Raffone, 2013
- Drapetis laeta Melander, 1918
- Drapetis laevis Becker, 1914
- Drapetis languinosa Bezzi, 1914
- Drapetis latipennis Melander, 1902
- Drapetis laut Grootaert & Shamshev, 2012
- Drapetis lenkoi Smith, 1962
- Drapetis lineola Meijere, 1911
- Drapetis litoralis Smith, 1965
- Drapetis longicalcaris Saigusa, 1965
- Drapetis lutea Meijere, 1911
- Drapetis luteicollis Melander, 1918
- Drapetis macropalpis Smith, 1962
- Drapetis mandai Grootaert & Shamshev, 2012
- Drapetis marginalis Bezzi, 1912
- Drapetis mariae Steyskal, 1953
- Drapetis mazaruni Smith, 1963
- Drapetis melanura Bezzi, 1912
- Drapetis metatarsata Bezzi, 1904
- Drapetis mexicana Melander, 1918
- Drapetis micropyga Melander, 1918
- Drapetis minuta Williston, 1896
- Drapetis monochaeta Bezzi, 1909
- Drapetis mortuum Meunier, 1908
- Drapetis munarii Raffone, 2013
- Drapetis naevia Rogers, 1983
- Drapetis naica Melander, 1918
- Drapetis nigricans Melander, 1918
- Drapetis nigrinotum Smith, 1962
- Drapetis nigrispina Saigusa, 1965
- Drapetis nigropunctata Senior-White, 1922
- Drapetis nitens Melander, 1918
- Drapetis nitidifrons (Frey, 1958)
- Drapetis notatithorax Senior-White, 1922
- Drapetis nuda Melander, 1918
- Drapetis nyaka Smith, 1969
- Drapetis obliquinervis Meijere, 1914
- Drapetis obscuripennis Philippi, 1865
- Drapetis obtusa Yang & Yang, 1990
- Drapetis oedimera Melander, 1918
- Drapetis onconeura Rogers, 1983
- Drapetis oribiensis Smith, 1969
- Drapetis palpata Meijere, 1911
- Drapetis pandai Smith, 1969
- Drapetis pantai Grootaert & Shamshev, 2012
- Drapetis panyasis Séguy, 1950
- Drapetis parilis Collin, 1926
- Drapetis paucisaetosa Raffone, 1994
- Drapetis pennescens Melander, 1918
- Drapetis perplexa Smith, 1962
- Drapetis pictitarsis Engel, 1939
- Drapetis pictithorax Bezzi, 1912
- Drapetis pilosa Melander, 1918
- Drapetis plagiata Bezzi, 1908
- Drapetis pleuralis Melander, 1918
- Drapetis plumea Melander, 1918
- Drapetis plumicornis Senior-White, 1922
- Drapetis plumipes Melander, 1918
- Drapetis populi Steyskal, 1953
- Drapetis procurrens Melander, 1928
- Drapetis pubicornis Bezzi, 1912
- Drapetis pusilla Loew, 1859
- Drapetis pusilla var. fumipennis Strobl, 1906
- Drapetis quadridpina Collart, 1934
- Drapetis quadrisetosa Melander, 1918
- Drapetis rectineura Melander, 1918
- Drapetis rufipes Brunetti, 1913
- Drapetis rutundicornis Brunetti, 1913
- Drapetis sanguensis Smith, 1965
- Drapetis sanguinea Lynch Arribálzaga, 1878
- Drapetis savaiiensis Collin, 1929
- Drapetis scutellaris Bezzi, 1912
- Drapetis sebetuanei Smith, 1969
- Drapetis secunda Smith, 1969
- Drapetis sekeletui Smith, 1969
- Drapetis seminigra Melander, 1918
- Drapetis septentrionalis Melander, 1902
- Drapetis setulosa Melander, 1918
- Drapetis similis Smith, 1963
- Drapetis simplicipes Melander, 1918
- Drapetis simulans Collin, 1961
- Drapetis solaris Rogers, 1989
- Drapetis spinipes Melander, 1918
- Drapetis stackelbergi Kovalev, 1972
- Drapetis steyskali Rogers, 1983
- Drapetis stictica Rogers, 1983
- Drapetis storai Frey, 1936
- Drapetis striigifera (Meijere, 1911)
- Drapetis subparilis Raffone, 2013
- Drapetis tenera Melander, 1918
- Drapetis tiagoana (Frey, 1958)
- Drapetis tibialis Rogers, 1983
- Drapetis tomentosa Smith, 1969
- Drapetis torulosa Rogers, 1989
- Drapetis trichura Melander, 1918
- Drapetis tuberculata Rogers, 1983
- Drapetis tumbinensis Smith, 1969
- Drapetis ukhalo Smith, 1965
- Drapetis uniseta Melander, 1918
- Drapetis univittata Smith, 1962
- Drapetis upsilon Melander, 1918
- Drapetis uralo Smith, 1965
- Drapetis variata Melander, 1918
- Drapetis ventralis Yang & Grootaert, 2006
- Drapetis vitiosum Meunier, 1908
- Drapetis vittata Melander, 1918
- Drapetis xanthopoda Williston, 1896
- Drapetis xanthopyga Bezzi, 1904
- Drapetis zonalis Curran, 1932
