= Megagrapha =

Scientific classification
- Kingdom: Animalia
- Phylum: Arthropoda
- Class: Insecta
- Order: Diptera
- Family: Hybotidae
- Subfamily: Tachydromiinae
- Tribe: Drapetini
- Genus: Megagrapha; Melander, 1928

Type species
- Drapetis pubescens Loew, 1862

Genus of flies

Megagrapha is a genus of flies in the family Hybotidae.

== Species ==
- Megagrapha europaea Papp & Földvári, 2002
- Megagrapha exquisita (Malloch, 1923)
- Megagrapha platytarsis Chillcott, 1983
- Megagrapha pubescens (Loew, 1862)
- Megagrapha starki Barták & Grootaert, 2021
