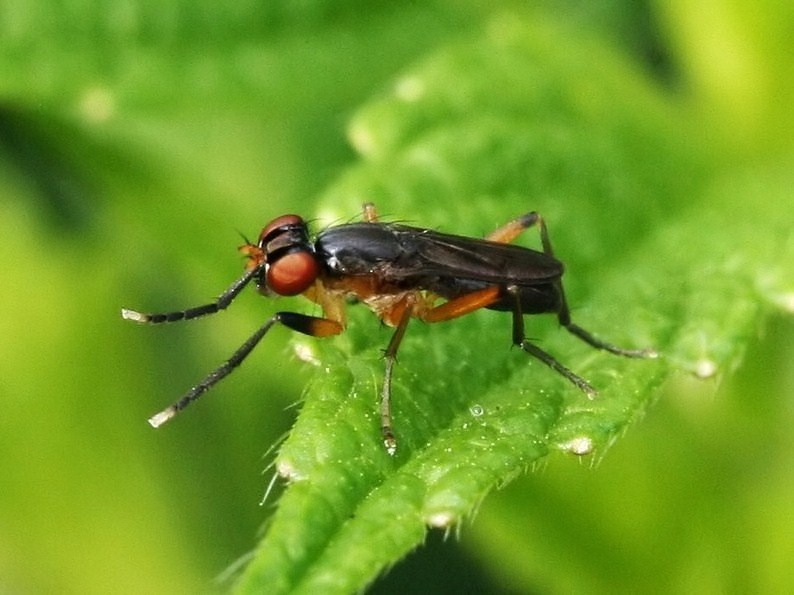
- Anticheta brevipennis Netherlands

Scientific classification
- Kingdom: Animalia
- Phylum: Arthropoda
- Clade: Pancrustacea
- Class: Insecta
- Order: Diptera
- Family: Sciomyzidae
- Genus: Anticheta
- Species: A. brevipennis

Binomial name
- Anticheta brevipennis (Zetterstedt, 1846)

= Anticheta brevipennis =

Species of fly

Anticheta brevipennis is a species of fly in the family Sciomyzidae. It is found in the Palearctic
