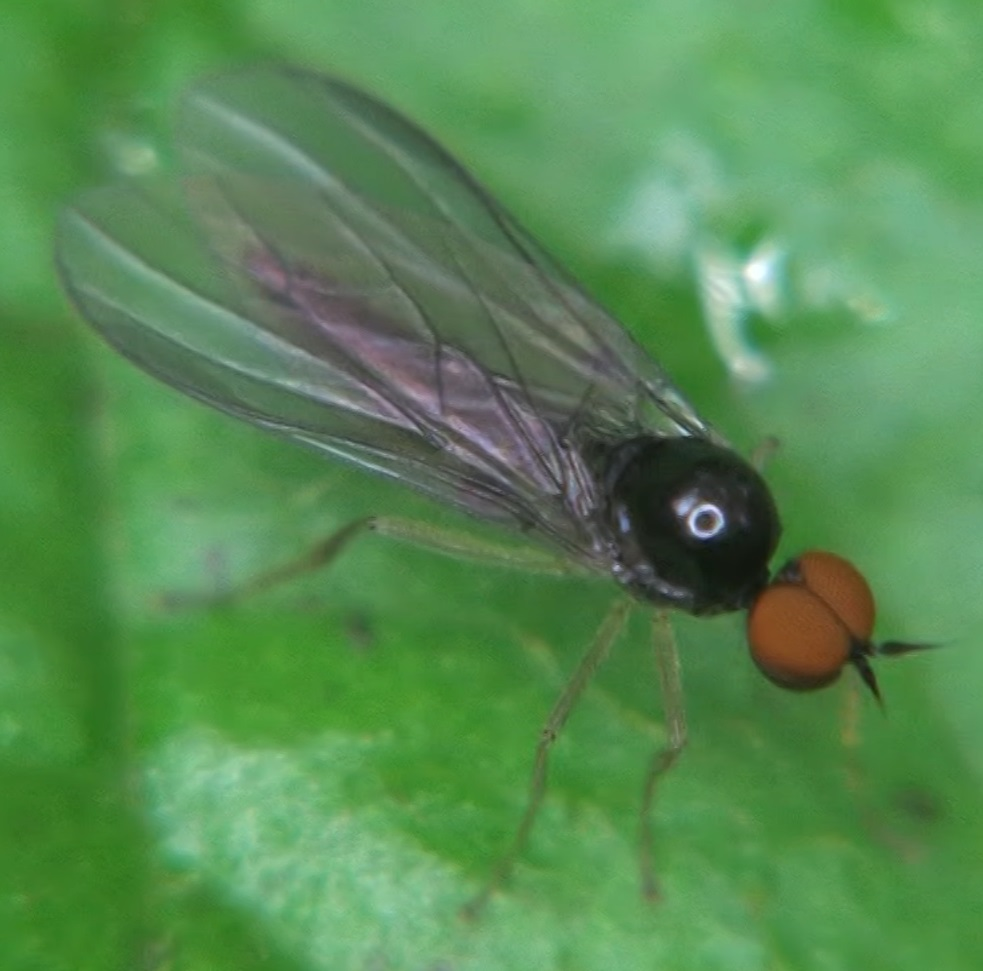
- Trichinomyia flavipes

Scientific classification
- Kingdom: Animalia
- Phylum: Arthropoda
- Class: Insecta
- Order: Diptera
- Family: Hybotidae
- Subfamily: Trichininae
- Genus: Trichinomyia; Tuomikoski, 1959

Type species
- Trichina flavipes Meigen, 1830

= Trichinomyia =

Genus of flies

Trichinomyia is a genus of flies in the family Hybotidae.

== Species ==
- Trichinomyia fuscipes (Zetterstedt, 1838)
