= Austrodromia =

Scientific classification
- Kingdom: Animalia
- Phylum: Arthropoda
- Class: Insecta
- Order: Diptera
- Family: Hybotidae
- Subfamily: Tachydromiinae
- Tribe: Drapetini
- Genus: Austrodromia; Collin, 1933

Type species
- Austrodromia indifferens Collin, 1933

Genus of flies

Austrodromia is a genus of flies in the family Hybotidae.

== Species ==
- Austrodromia blomae Chillcott & Teskey, 1983
- Austrodromia breviseta Smith, 1962
- Austrodromia collini Smith, 1962
- Austrodromia furcaticauda Collin, 1933
- Austrodromia indifferens Collin, 1933
- Austrodromia parfemoralis Chillcott & Teskey, 1983
- Austrodromia peruviana Chillcott, 1983
- Austrodromia polychaeta Smith, 1962
- Austrodromia rufiscuta Chillcott & Teskey, 1983
- Austrodromia talaris Collin, 1933
- Austrodromia umbonata Chillcott, 1983
- Austrodromia valdiviana Philippi, 1865
- Austrodromia yacochuyae Claps, 1991
