= Pontodromia =

Scientific classification
- Kingdom: Animalia
- Phylum: Arthropoda
- Class: Insecta
- Order: Diptera
- Family: Hybotidae
- Subfamily: Tachydromiinae
- Tribe: Drapetini
- Genus: Pontodromia; Grootaert, 1994

Type species
- Pontodromia nambis Grootaert, 1994

Genus of flies

Pontodromia is a genus of flies in the family Hybotidae.

== Species ==
- Pontodromia nambis Grootaert, 1994
- Pontodromia pantai Grootaert & Shamshev, 2012
