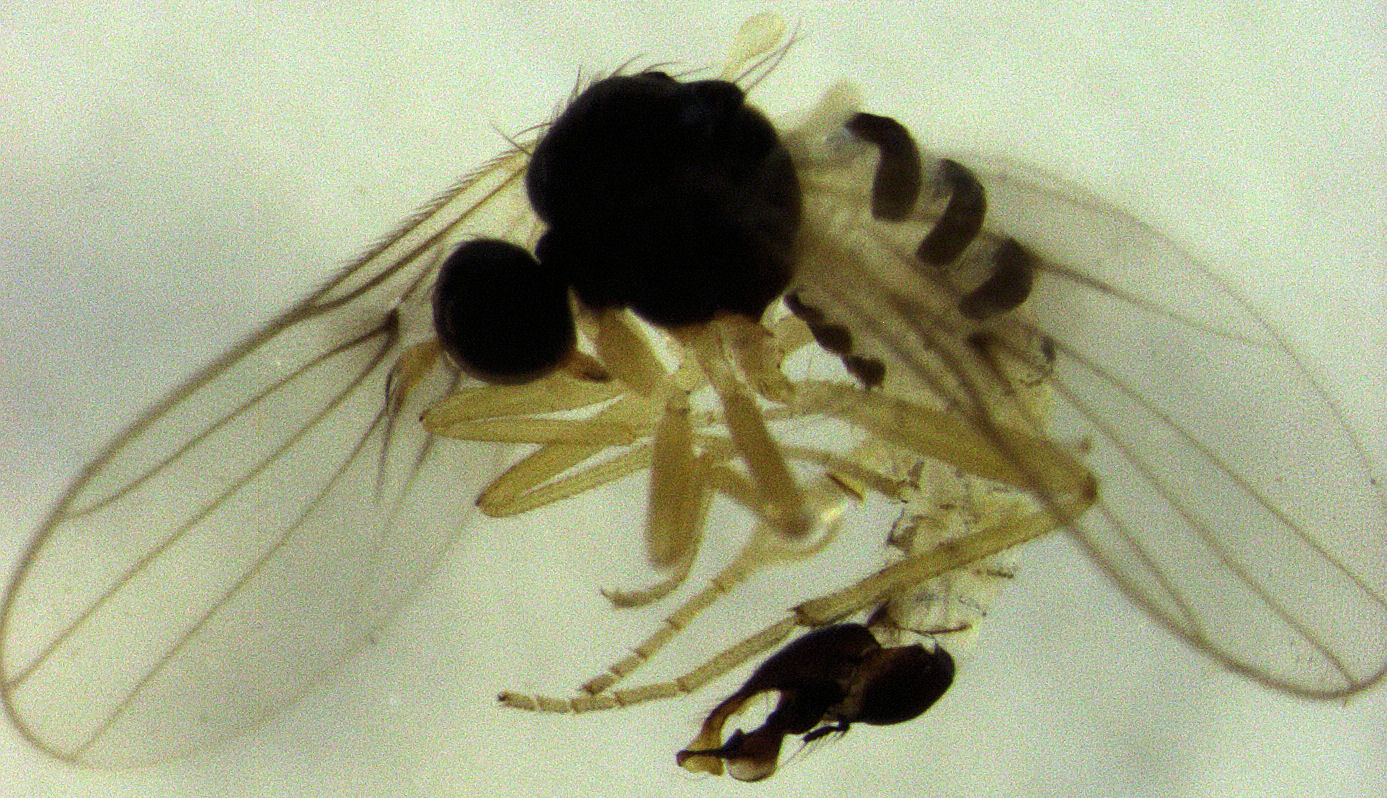
- Isodrapetis nitidiuscula

Scientific classification
- Kingdom: Animalia
- Phylum: Arthropoda
- Clade: Pancrustacea
- Class: Insecta
- Order: Diptera
- Family: Hybotidae
- Subfamily: Tachydromiinae
- Tribe: Drapetini
- Genus: Isodrapetis; Collin, 1928

Type species
- Isodrapetis nitidula Collin, 1928

= Isodrapetis =

Genus of flies

Isodrapetis is a genus of flies in the family Hybotidae.

== Species ==
- Isodrapetis excava Plant, 1999
- Isodrapetis hyalina Plant, 1999
- Isodrapetis meridionalis Sinclair & Cumming, 2013
- Isodrapetis nitidiuscula Plant, 1999
- Isodrapetis nitidula Collin, 1928
- Isodrapetis rauparaha Plant, 1999
- Isodrapetis spinositibia Plant, 1999
- Isodrapetis subpollinosa Collin, 1928
- Isodrapetis suda Collin, 1928
