= Nanodromia =

Scientific classification
- Kingdom: Animalia
- Phylum: Arthropoda
- Class: Insecta
- Order: Diptera
- Family: Hybotidae
- Subfamily: Tachydromiinae
- Tribe: Drapetini
- Genus: Nanodromia; Grootaert, 1994

Type species
- Nanodromia elongata Grootaert, 1994

Genus of flies

Nanodromia is a genus of flies in the family Hybotidae.

== Species ==
- Nanodromia cryptica Grootaert, 1994
- Nanodromia elongata Grootaert, 1994
- Nanodromia hutan Grootaert & Shamshev, 2012
- Nanodromia narmjeud Grootaert & Shamshev, 2003
- Nanodromia narmkroi Grootaert & Shamshev, 2003
- Nanodromia phukhao Grootaert & Shamshev, 2003
- Nanodromia spinulosa Grootaert & Shamshev, 2012
- Nanodromia spuria Grootaert, 1994
- Nanodromia taksin Grootaert & Shamshev, 2003
