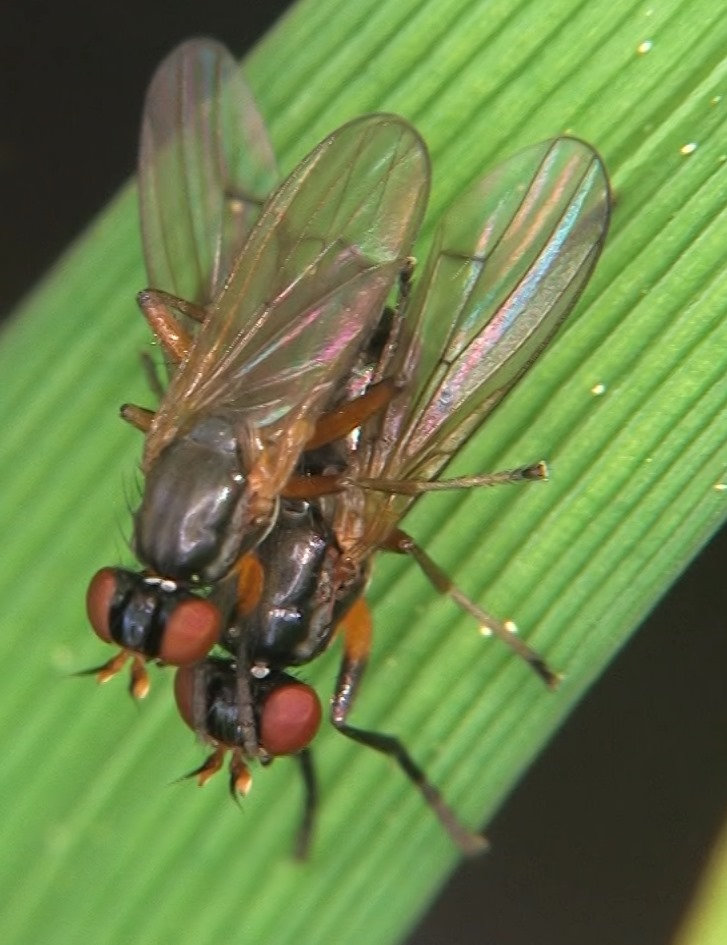

Scientific classification
- Kingdom: Animalia
- Phylum: Arthropoda
- Class: Insecta
- Order: Diptera
- Family: Sciomyzidae
- Genus: Anticheta
- Species: A. atriseta

Binomial name
- Anticheta atriseta (Loew, 1849)

= Anticheta atriseta =

Species of fly

Anticheta atriseta is a species of fly in the family Sciomyzidae, the marsh flies or snail-killing flies.
