= Dusmetina =

Scientific classification
- Kingdom: Animalia
- Phylum: Arthropoda
- Class: Insecta
- Order: Diptera
- Family: Hybotidae
- Subfamily: Tachydromiinae
- Tribe: Drapetini
- Genus: Dusmetina; Gil Collado, 1930

Type species
- Dusmetina iberica Gil Collado, 1930

Genus of flies

Dusmetina is a genus of flies in the family Hybotidae.

== Species ==
- Dusmetina iberica Gil Collado, 1930
