= Trichininae =

Scientific classification
- Kingdom: Animalia
- Phylum: Arthropoda
- Clade: Pancrustacea
- Class: Insecta
- Order: Diptera
- Family: Hybotidae
- Subfamily: Trichininae; Chvála, 1983

Subfamily of flies

Trichininae is a subfamily of hybotid flies.

== Genera ==
- Trichina Meigen, 1830
- Trichinomyia Tuomikoski, 1959
