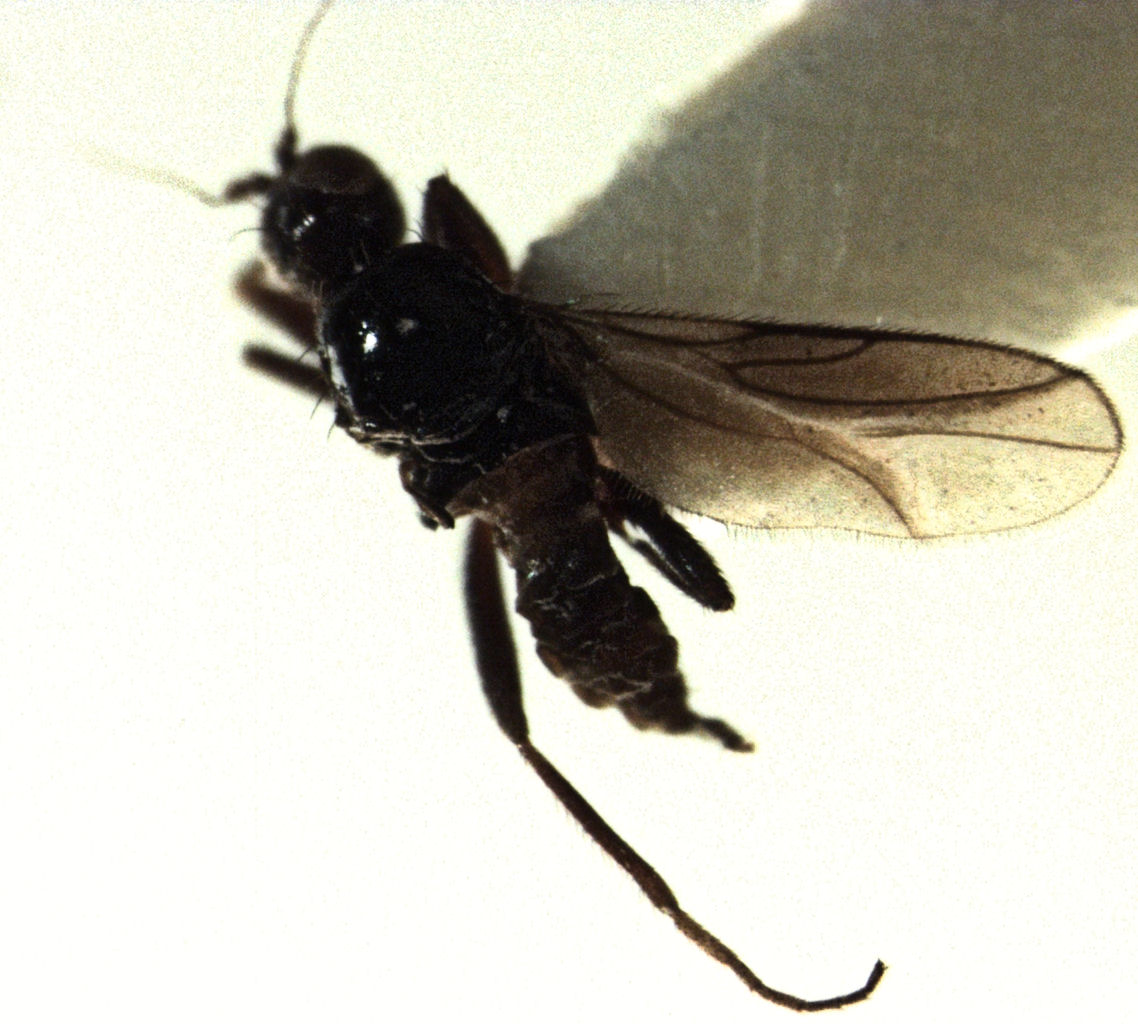
- Ngaheremyia fuscipennis (female), body length about 2 mm

Scientific classification
- Kingdom: Animalia
- Phylum: Arthropoda
- Clade: Pancrustacea
- Class: Insecta
- Order: Diptera
- Family: Hybotidae
- Subfamily: Tachydromiinae
- Tribe: Drapetini
- Genus: Ngaheremyia; Plant & Didham, 2006

= Ngaheremyia =

Genus of flies

Ngaheremyia is a monotypic hybotid fly genus endemic to New Zealand. The sole species is Ngaheremyia fuscipennis.
