= Dysaletria =

Scientific classification
- Kingdom: Animalia
- Phylum: Arthropoda
- Class: Insecta
- Order: Diptera
- Family: Hybotidae
- Subfamily: Tachydromiinae
- Tribe: Tachydromiini
- Genus: Dysaletria; Loew, 1864

Genus of flies

Dysaletria is a genus of flies in the family Hybotidae.

== Species ==
- Dysaletria atriceps (Boheman, 1852)
- Dysaletria complicans (Frey, 1958)
- Dysaletria diabolica (Meunier, 1908)
- Dysaletria nigripennis Chvála, 1975
- Dysaletria varicolor (Becker, 1908)
