= Austrodrapetis =

Scientific classification
- Kingdom: Animalia
- Phylum: Arthropoda
- Class: Insecta
- Order: Diptera
- Family: Hybotidae
- Subfamily: Tachydromiinae
- Tribe: Drapetini
- Genus: Austrodrapetis; Smith, 1964

Type species
- Austrodrapetis coxalis Smith, 1964

Genus of flies

Austrodrapetis is a genus of flies in the family Hybotidae.

== Species ==
- Austrodrapetis coxalis Smith, 1964
