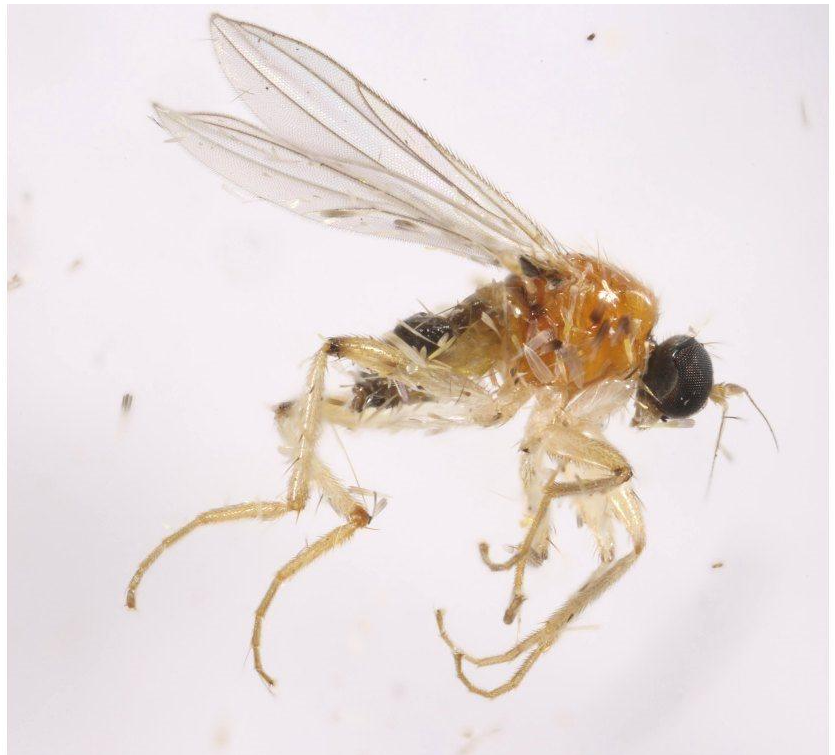
- Hermit Park, Townsville, QLD
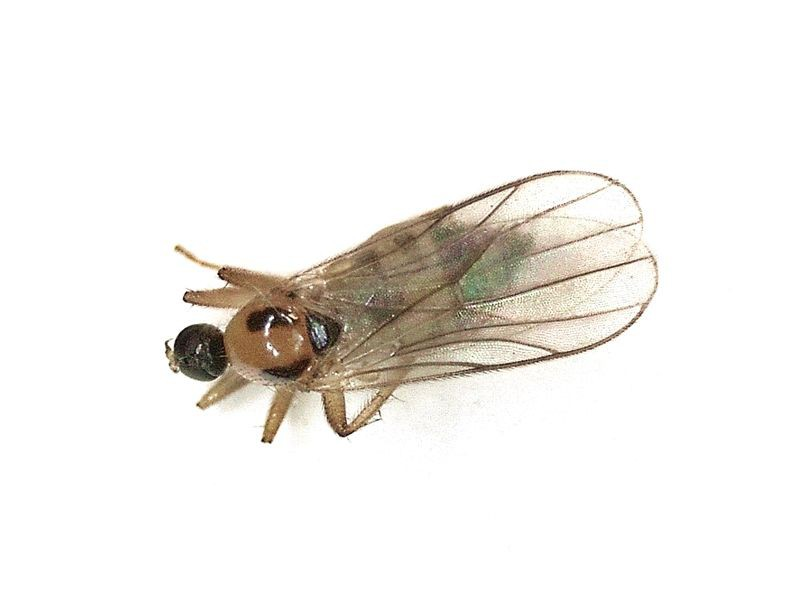
- E. ephippiata, Arnhem, the Netherlands

Scientific classification
- Kingdom: Animalia
- Phylum: Arthropoda
- Class: Insecta
- Order: Diptera
- Family: Hybotidae
- Subfamily: Tachydromiinae
- Tribe: Drapetini
- Genus: Elaphropeza; Macquart, 1827

Type species
- Tachydromia ephippiata Fallén, 1815

Synonyms
- Ctenodrapetis Bezzi, 1904

= Elaphropeza =

Genus of flies

Elaphropeza is a genus of flies in the family Hybotidae, first described by Pierre-Justin-Marie Macquart in 1827.

== Species ==
- Elaphropeza abnormalis (Yang & Yang, 1990)
- Elaphropeza acantha Shamshev, 2007
- Elaphropeza adelphide Quate, 1960
- Elaphropeza alamaculata Yang, Yang & Hu, 2002
- Elaphropeza anae Yang & Gaimari, 2005
- Elaphropeza asexa Shamshev, 2007
- Elaphropeza asiophila Shamshev, 2007
- Elaphropeza atrilinea Quate, 1960
- Elaphropeza baliensis Grootaert, Van de Velde & Shamshev, 2015
- Elaphropeza belumut Shamshev, 2007
- Elaphropeza benitotani Shamshev, 2007
- Elaphropeza bergonzoi Raffone, 2000
- Elaphropeza bezzii Shamshev, 2007
- Elaphropeza bicolor Bezzi, 1904
- Elaphropeza bihamata (Bezzi, 1904)
- Elaphropeza biseta Wang, Zhang & Yang, 2015
- Elaphropeza bisetifera Yang, Yang & Hu, 2002
- Elaphropeza bulohensis Shamshev, 2007
- Elaphropeza callosotibia (Bezzi, 1904)
- Elaphropeza cattiensis Grootaert & Shamshev, 2009
- Elaphropeza centristria (Yang & Yang, 2003)
- Elaphropeza chanae Grootaert & Shamshev, 2012
- Elaphropeza chebalingensis Yang, Merz & Grootaert, 2006
- Elaphropeza chekjawa Shamshev, 2007
- Elaphropeza ciliatocosta (Bezzi, 1904)
- Elaphropeza collini Grootaert & Shamshev, 2012
- Elaphropeza combinata Shamshev, 2007
- Elaphropeza confusa (Curran, 1936)
- Elaphropeza crassicercus Shamshev, 2007
- Elaphropeza crockeri (Curran, 1936)
- Elaphropeza darrenyeoi Shamshev, 2007
- Elaphropeza demeijerei Shamshev, 2007
- Elaphropeza ekphysis Quate, 1960
- Elaphropeza ephippiata (Fallén, 1815)
- Elaphropeza equalis Shamshev, 2007
- Elaphropeza feminata Shamshev, 2007
- Elaphropeza flavicaput Shamshev, 2007
- Elaphropeza formosae Bezzi, 1907
- Elaphropeza fujianensis (Yang & Yang, 2003)
- Elaphropeza furca Shamshev, 2007
- Elaphropeza furcatella Grootaert, 2019
- Elaphropeza fuzhouensis (Yang & Yang, 2003)
- Elaphropeza gohae Grootaert & Shamshev, 2012
- Elaphropeza gracilis (Bezzi, 1904)
- Elaphropeza guangdongensis (Yang, Gaimari & Grootaert, 2005)
- Elaphropeza guangxiensis (Yang & Yang, 1992)
- Elaphropeza guenardi Grootaert, 2019
- Elaphropeza hamifera (Bezzi, 1912)
- Elaphropeza hirsutiterga Grootaert & Shamshev, 2009
- Elaphropeza hongkongensis Grootaert, 2019
- Elaphropeza hongshulin Grootaert, 2019
- Elaphropeza huaguoshana Yang, Wang, Zhu & Zhang, 2010
- Elaphropeza jianyangensis (Yang & Yang, 2003)
- Elaphropeza jinghongensis (Yang & Yang, 1990)
- Elaphropeza kranjiensis Grootaert & Shamshev, 2012
- Elaphropeza kunmingana (Yang & Yang, 1990)
- Elaphropeza lamdongensis Wang, Zhang & Yang, 2015
- Elaphropeza lancangensis (Yang & Yang, 1990)
- Elaphropeza lii (Yang & Yang, 1990)
- Elaphropeza limosa Shamshev, 2007
- Elaphropeza liui Yang & Gaimari, 2005
- Elaphropeza longiconica (Yang & Yang, 1993)
- Elaphropeza lowi Grootaert & Shamshev, 2012
- Elaphropeza luanae Shamshev, 2007
- Elaphropeza luteoides Shamshev, 2007
- Elaphropeza maculata Raffone, 2001
- Elaphropeza malayensis Shamshev, 2007
- Elaphropeza maoershanensis Yang & Grootaert, 2006
- Elaphropeza medipunctata (Yang & Yang, 1994)
- Elaphropeza meieri Shamshev, 2007
- Elaphropeza meihuashana (Yang & Yang, 2003)
- Elaphropeza melanderi Shamshev, 2007
- Elaphropeza melinhana Wang, Zhang & Yang, 2015
- Elaphropeza modesta Shamshev, 2007
- Elaphropeza monacantha Shamshev, 2007
- Elaphropeza monospina Shamshev, 2007
- Elaphropeza murphyi Shamshev, 2007
- Elaphropeza nankunshanensis Yang & Grootaert, 2006
- Elaphropeza nanlingensis (Yang, Gaimari & Grootaert, 2005)
- Elaphropeza neesoonensis Shamshev, 2007
- Elaphropeza ngi Shamshev, 2007
- Elaphropeza obtusa (Yang & Yang, 2004)
- Elaphropeza pallidarista Yang, Yang & Hu, 2002
- Elaphropeza parva Wang, Zhang & Yang, 2015
- Elaphropeza pauper Shamshev, 2007
- Elaphropeza pilata (Yang & Yang, 1994)
- Elaphropeza plumata Yang, Merz & Grootaert, 2006
- Elaphropeza pluriacantha Shamshev, 2007
- Elaphropeza pollicata Quate, 1960
- Elaphropeza ponapensis Quate, 1960
- Elaphropeza postica Wang, Zhang & Yang, 2015
- Elaphropeza postnigra (Yang & Yang, 1990)
- Elaphropeza pseudoabbreviata Raffone, 2001
- Elaphropeza pseudodispar Raffone, 1990
- Elaphropeza pseudoephippiata Raffone, 2003
- Elaphropeza pseudomarginata Raffone, 2001
- Elaphropeza quatei Shamshev, 2007
- Elaphropeza ralloi Raffone, 1991
- Elaphropeza riatanae Shamshev & Grootaert, 2007
- Elaphropeza rubrithorax (Bezzi, 1904)
- Elaphropeza ruiliensis (Yang & Yang, 1990)
- Elaphropeza semakau Grootaert & Shamshev, 2012
- Elaphropeza semibadia Quate, 1960
- Elaphropeza setulosa Raffone, 2001
- Elaphropeza shufenae Grootaert & Shamshev, 2012
- Elaphropeza sime Shamshev, 2007
- Elaphropeza singaporensis Shamshev, 2007
- Elaphropeza singularis Wang, Zhang & Yang, 2015
- Elaphropeza singulata Shamshev, 2007
- Elaphropeza sinikorensis Raffone, 1990
- Elaphropeza sivasothii Shamshev, 2007
- Elaphropeza spicata Shamshev, 2007
- Elaphropeza spiralis Shamshev, 2007
- Elaphropeza spuria Bezzi, 1904
- Elaphropeza striata (Yang & Yang, 1993)
- Elaphropeza sylvicola Shamshev, 2007
- Elaphropeza temasek Shamshev, 2007
- Elaphropeza tiomanensis Shamshev, 2007
- Elaphropeza triangulata (Yang & Yang, 1993)
- Elaphropeza trimaculata (Yang & Yang, 1990)
- Elaphropeza triseta Grootaert, Van de Velde & Shamshev, 2015
- Elaphropeza ubinensis Shamshev, 2007
- Elaphropeza vietnamensis Grootaert & Shamshev, 2009
- Elaphropeza xanthina (Yang & Yang, 1990)
- Elaphropeza xanthocephala Bezzi, 1912
- Elaphropeza xingyuei Wang, Zhang & Yang, 2015
- Elaphropeza xizangensis (Yang & Yang, 1989)
- Elaphropeza yangi Shamshev, 2007
- Elaphropeza yeoi Shamshev, 2007
- Elaphropeza yunnanensis (Yang & Yang, 1993)
