= Atodrapetis =

Scientific classification
- Kingdom: Animalia
- Phylum: Arthropoda
- Class: Insecta
- Order: Diptera
- Family: Hybotidae
- Subfamily: Tachydromiinae
- Tribe: Drapetini
- Genus: Atodrapetis; Plant, 1998

Type species
- Atodrapetis infrapratula Plant, 1998

Genus of flies

Atodrapetis is a genus of flies in the family Hybotidae.

== Species ==
- Atodrapetis infrapratula Plant, 1998
