= Chaetodromia =

Scientific classification
- Kingdom: Animalia
- Phylum: Arthropoda
- Class: Insecta
- Order: Diptera
- Family: Hybotidae
- Subfamily: Tachydromiinae
- Tribe: Drapetini
- Genus: Chaetodromia; Teskey, 1983

Type species
- Chaetodromia masoni Teskey, 1983

Genus of flies

Chaetodromia is a genus of flies in the family Hybotidae.

== Species ==
- Chaetodromia macalpinei Chillcott, 1983
- Chaetodromia masoni Chillcott, 1983
- †Chaetodromia pulchra Solórzano-Kraemer, Sinclair & Cumming, 2005
