= Sinodrapetis =

Scientific classification
- Kingdom: Animalia
- Phylum: Arthropoda
- Class: Insecta
- Order: Diptera
- Family: Hybotidae
- Subfamily: Tachydromiinae
- Tribe: Drapetini
- Genus: Sinodrapetis; Gaimari & Grootaert, 2004

Type species
- Sinodrapetis basiflava Gaimari & Grootaert, 2004

Genus of flies

Sinodrapetis is a genus of flies in the family Hybotidae.

== Species ==
- Sinodrapetis basiflava Yang, Gaimari & Grootaert, 2004
