= Symballophthalmus =

Scientific classification
- Kingdom: Animalia
- Phylum: Arthropoda
- Class: Insecta
- Order: Diptera
- Family: Hybotidae
- Subfamily: Tachydromiinae
- Tribe: Symballophthalmini
- Genus: Symballophthalmus; Becker, 1889

Type species
- Macroptera pictipes Becker, 1889

Synonyms
- Macroptera Becker, 1889

Genus of flies

Symballophthalmus is a genus of flies in the family Hybotidae.

== Species ==
- Symballophthalmus asiaticus Kovalev, 1977
- †Symballophthalmus clavilabrosus Hong, 1981
- Symballophthalmus dissimilis (Fallén, 1815)
- Symballophthalmus fuscitarsis (Zetterstedt, 1859)
- Symballophthalmus inermis Papp, 2003
- Symballophthalmus masoni Chillcott, 1958
- Symballophthalmus pictipes (Becker, 1889)
- Symballophthalmus speciosus Saigusa, 1963
- Symballophthalmus viennai Raffone, 1986
