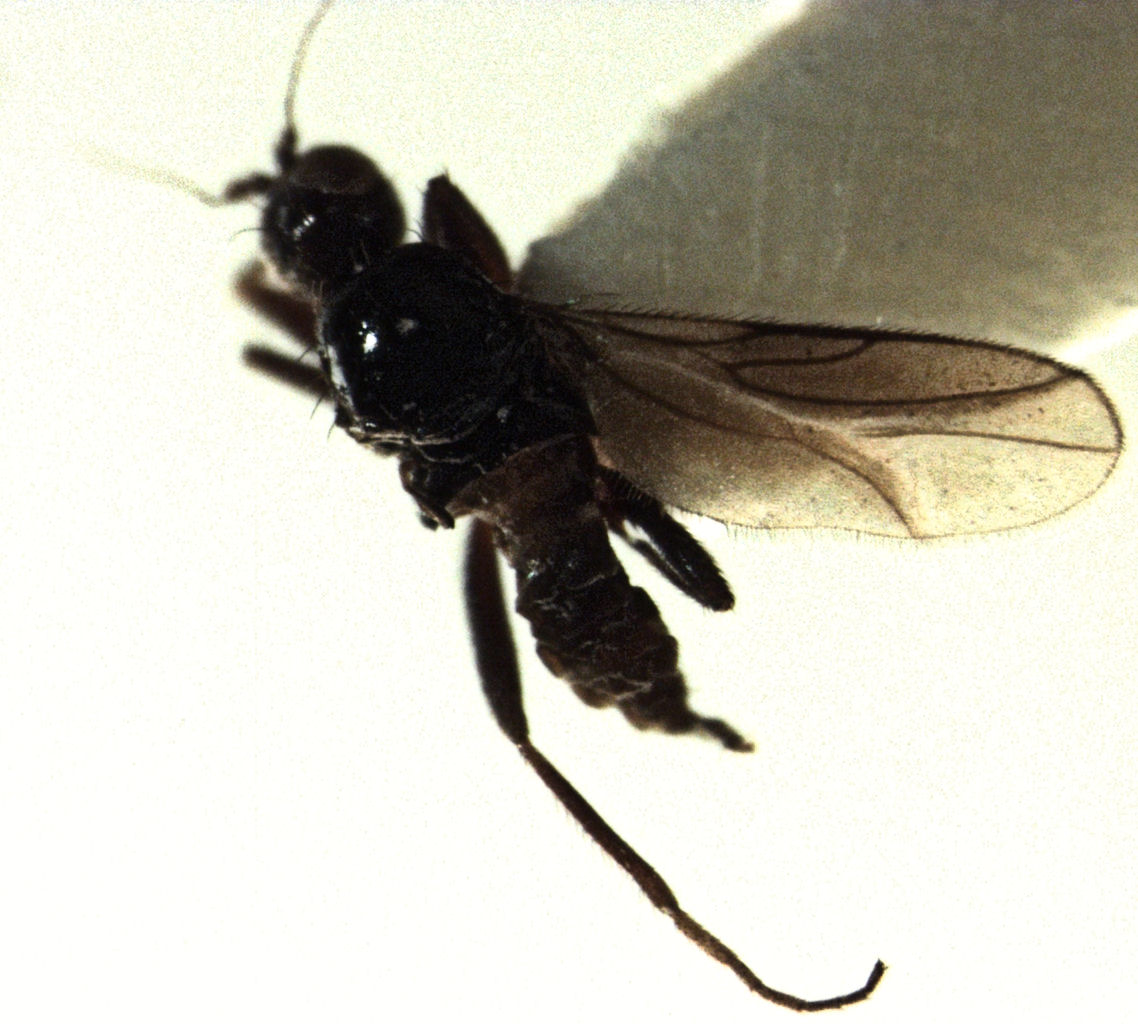
- Ngaheremyia fuscipennis

Scientific classification
- Kingdom: Animalia
- Phylum: Arthropoda
- Class: Insecta
- Order: Diptera
- Family: Hybotidae
- Subfamily: Tachydromiinae
- Tribe: Drapetini; Collin, 1961

= Drapetini =

Tribe of flies

Drapetini is a tribe of hybotid flies widespread in the world. There are 19 currently recognised genera.

== Genera ==
- Allodromia Smith, 1962
- Atodrapetis Plant, 1997
- Austrodrapetis Smith, 1964
- Austrodromia Collin, 1961
- Chaetodromia Teskey, 1983
- Chersodromia Haliday in Walker, 1851
- Crossopalpus Bigot, 1857
- Drapetis Meigen, 1822
- Dusmetina Gil Collado, 1930
- Elaphropeza Macquart, 1827
- Isodrapetis Collin, 1961
- Megagrapha Melander, 1928
- Micrempis Melander, 1928
- Nanodromia Grootaert, 1994
- Ngaheremyia Plant & Didham, 2006
- Pontodromia Grootaert, 1994
- Sinodrapetis Yang, Gaimari & Grootaert, 2004
- Stilpon Loew, 1859

Data related to Drapetini at Wikispecies
