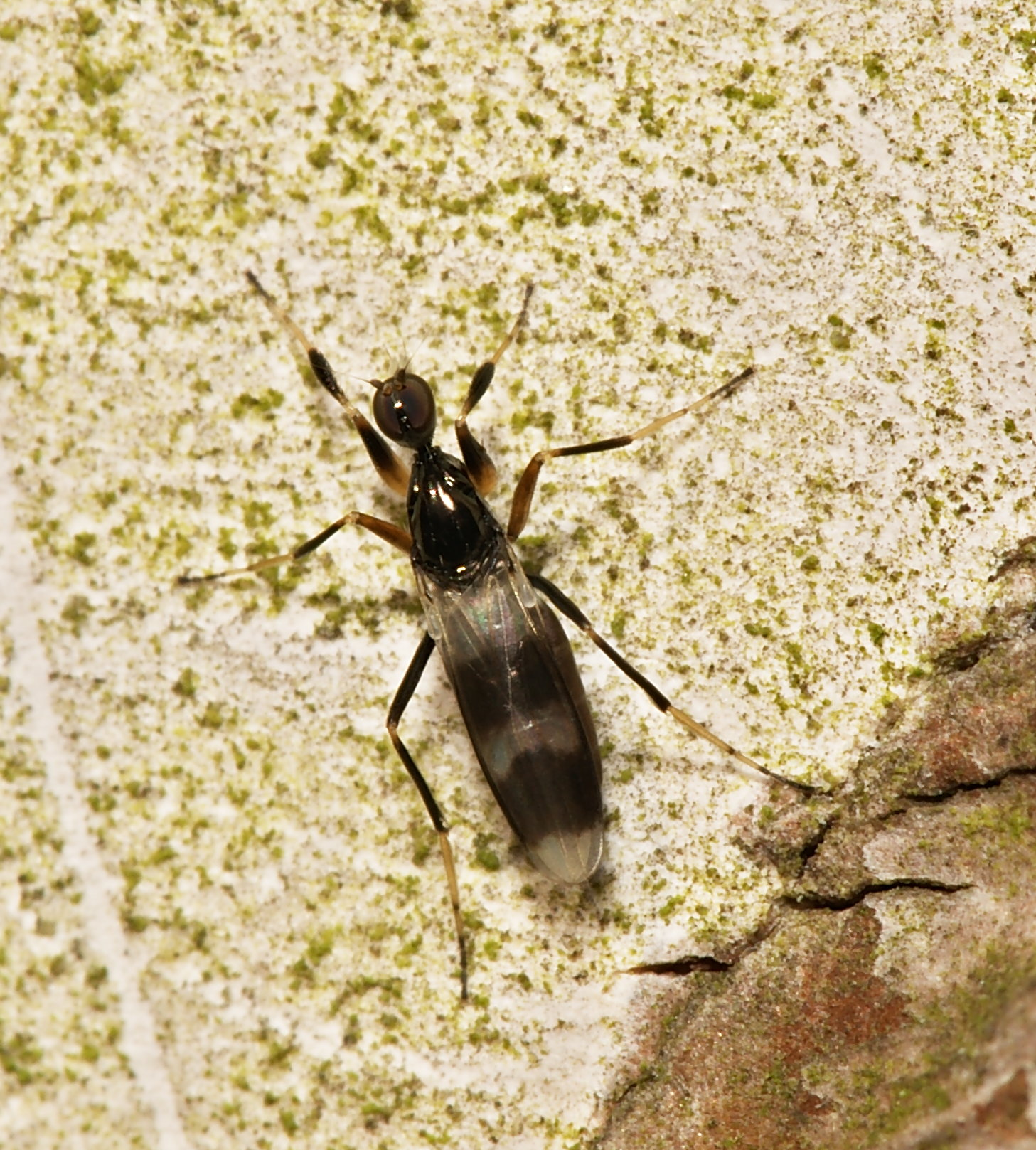
- Tachydromia cf. arrogans

Scientific classification
- Kingdom: Animalia
- Phylum: Arthropoda
- Clade: Pancrustacea
- Class: Insecta
- Order: Diptera
- Family: Hybotidae
- Subfamily: Tachydromiinae; Meigen, 1822

Tribes
- Drapetini Collin, 1961; Symballophthalmini; Tachydromiini

= Tachydromiinae =

Tachydromiinae Temporal range: Cenomanian–Present

Subfamily of flies

Tachydromiinae is a subfamily of hybotid flies widespread in the world.

== Tribes and Genera ==
- Tribe Symballophthalmini Bradley, Sinclair & Cumming, 2006
  - Symballophthalmus Becker, 1889
- Tribe Drapetini Collin, 1961
  - Allodromia Smith, 1962
  - Atodrapetis Plant, 1997
  - Austrodrapetis Smith, 1964
  - Austrodromia Collin, 1961
  - Chaetodromia Teskey, 1983
  - Chersodromia Haliday in Walker, 1851
  - Crossopalpus Bigot, 1857
  - Drapetis Meigen, 1822
  - Dusmetina Gil Collado, 1930
  - Elaphropeza Macquart, 1827
  - Isodrapetis Collin, 1961
  - Megagrapha Melander, 1928
  - Micrempis Melander, 1928
  - Nanodromia Grootaert, 1994
  - Ngaheremyia Plant & Didham, 2006
  - Pontodromia Grootaert, 1994
  - Sinodrapetis Yang, Gaimari & Grootaert, 2004
  - Stilpon Loew, 1859
- Tribe Tachydromiini
  - Dysaletria Loew, 1864
  - Platypalpus Macquart, 1828
  - Tachydromia Meigen, 1803
  - Tachyempis Melander, 1928
  - Tachypeza Meigen, 1830

=== Extinct genera ===
- †Archaeodrapetiops Martins-Neto et al., 1992 – Tremembé Formation, Brazil, Chattian
- †Archiplatypalpus Kovalev, 1974 – Taimyr Amber, Santonian
- †Cretoplatypalpus Kovalev, 1978 – Taimyr Amber, Cenomanian Canadian amber, Campanian
- †Eodromyia Myskowiak et al., 2018 – Oise amber, France, Ypresian
- †Drapetiella Meunier, 1908 – Baltic amber, Eocene
- †Electrocyrtoma Cockerell, 1917 – Burmese amber, Myanmar, Cenomanian
- †Lochmocola Hong, 1981 – Fushun amber, China, Ypresian
- †Mesoplatypalpus Grimaldi and Cumming, 1999 – Canadian amber, Campanian
