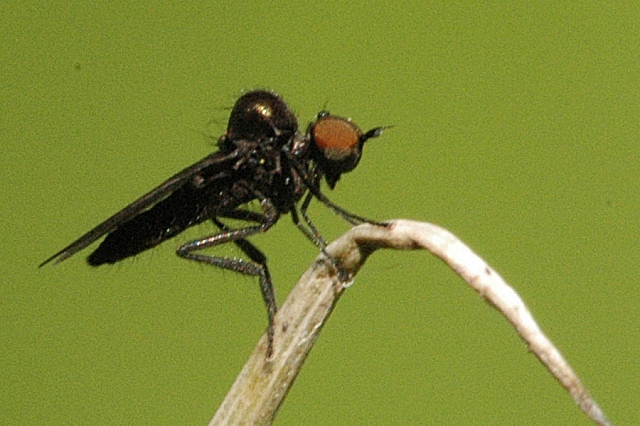
- Bicellaria spuria (Ocydromiinae: Bicellariini)

Scientific classification
- Kingdom: Animalia
- Phylum: Arthropoda
- Clade: Pancrustacea
- Class: Insecta
- Order: Diptera
- Suborder: Brachycera
- Infraorder: Asilomorpha
- Superfamily: Empidoidea
- Family: Hybotidae; Macquart, 1823

Subfamilies
- Hybotinae; Oedaleinae; Ocydromiinae; Trichininae; Tachydromiinae

= Hybotidae =

Hybotidae Temporal range: Barremian–Recent

Family of flies

Hybotidae, the typical dance flies, are a family of true flies. They belong to the superfamily Empidoidea and were formerly included in the Empididae as a subfamily.

Some, such as Tachydromia, are predators that run around on the bark of trees in complex patterns, hence the common name. Tachydromia species are only about three millimeters long.

== Description ==
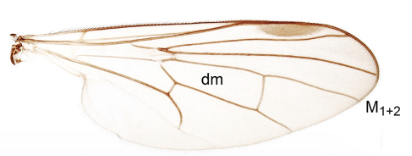
Right wing of the species Hybos grossipes, showing discal medial cell (dm) and first and second medial vein (M_{1+2})

Hybotidae share some similarities with the family Dolichopodidae when looking at the rotation of genitalia and wing characteristics. Male terminalia are rotated dextrally between 45° and 90°, excluding segment 7. Hybotidae wings always have a simple R_{4+5} vein, where the costa either ends near or at M_{1}/M_{1+2}, or near or at R_{4+5}/R_{5}. Furthermore, it can be distinguished from Dolichopodidae by a point at the origin of vein R_{s}, which occurs at a distance from the humeral crossvein (h) equal to or longer than the length of h.

== Systematics ==
The Hybotidae clearly form a lineage quite distinct from the Empididae. Among the Empidoidea, they represent a lineage more basal than the main radiation of Empididae and Dolichopodidae, though they are not as ancient as the genera placed in the Atelestidae.

By and large, the Hybotidae are monophyletic. Among its subfamilies, the Hybotinae and Tachydromiinae certainly represent clades. The status of the Ocydromiinae as a natural group is less clear, in particular whether the Trichininae should be included as tribe Trichinini or even in the Bicellariini or Oedaleini, or whether they are more distinct and warrant recognition as a separate subfamily.

Based on the most recent phylogenetic studies, the relationship between Hybotidae and other members of Empidoidea is as follows. The placement of Hybotidae is emphasized in bold formatting.

- Atelestidae
  - - Atelestinae
    - Nemedininae
- - **Hybotidae**
    - Bicellariinae
    - - - - - - Hybotinae
              - Oedaleinae
            - Ocydromiinae
          - Trichininae
        - Tachydromiinae
          - - Tachydromiini
            - Symballophthalmini
          - Drapetini
  - - Dolichopodidae
    - - Ragadidae
        - Iteaphilinae
        - Ragadinae
      - Empididae
        - Clinocerinae
        - - Brachystomatinae
            - Brachystomatini
            - Ceratomerini
            - Trichopezini
          - Empidinae
            - - Chelipodini
              - Empidini
            - - Hemerodromiini
              - Hilarini

=== Systematic list ===
The subfamilies with their tribes and selected genera are:

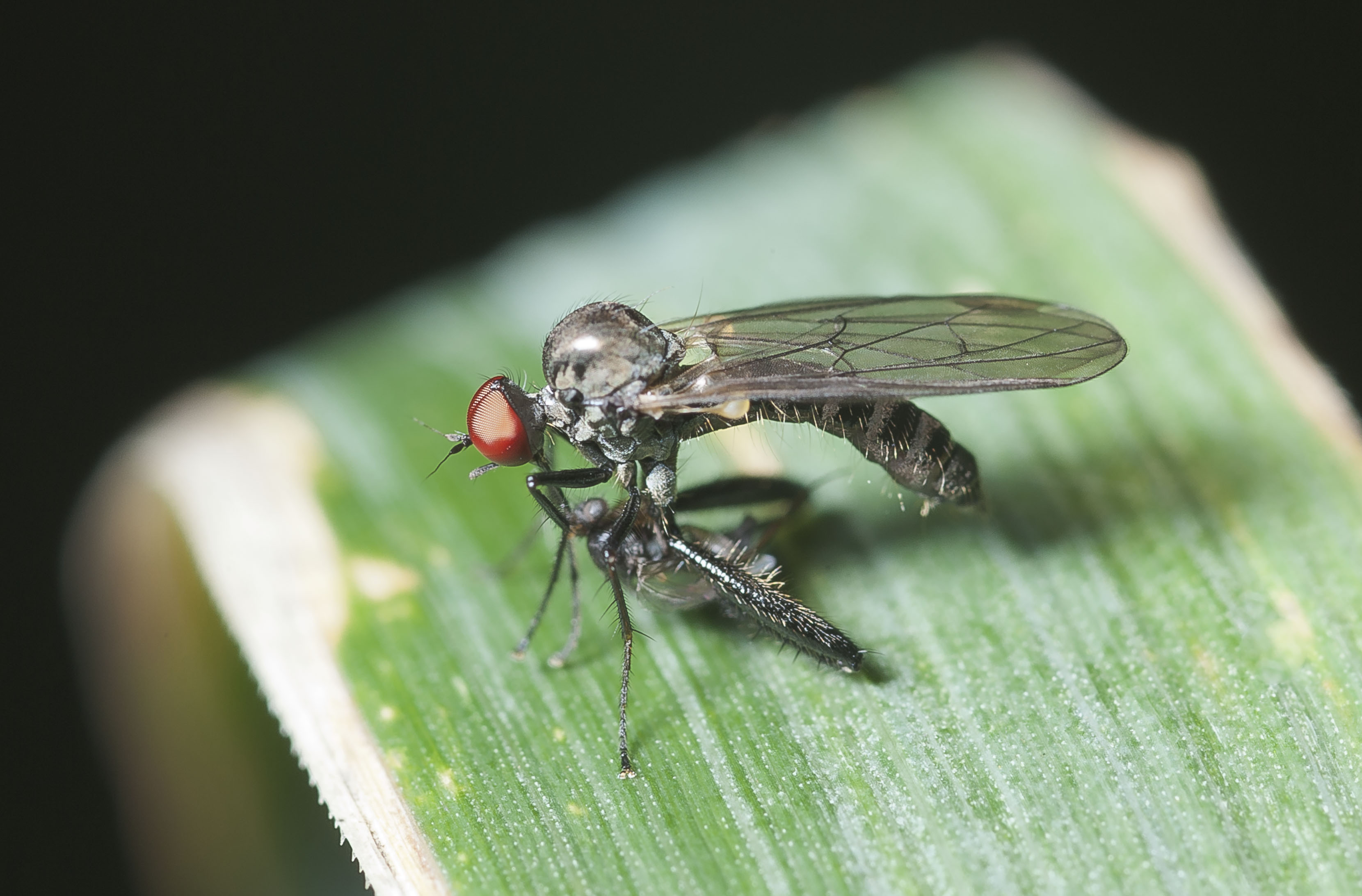
Hybos culiciformis (Hybotinae)

Hybotinae Meigen, 1820

- Acarterus Loew, 1858
- Afrohybos Smith, 1967
- Ceratohybos Bezzi
- Chillcottomyia Saigusa, 1986
- Euhybus Coquillett, 1895
- †Eternia Martins-Neto et al. 1992 Tremembé Formation, Brazil, Chattian
- Hybos Meigen, 1803
- Lactistomyia Melander, 1902
- Lamachella Melander, 1928
- Neohybos Ale-Rocha & Carvalho, 2003
- Parahybos Kertész, 1899
- †Pseudoacarterus Waters 1989 Orapa, Botswana, Turonian
- Smithybos Ale-Rocha, 2000
- Stenoproctus Loew, 1858
- Syndyas Loew, 1857
- Syneches Walker, 1852
- †Syneproctus Solórzano-Kraemer et al. 2020 Dominican amber, Miocene

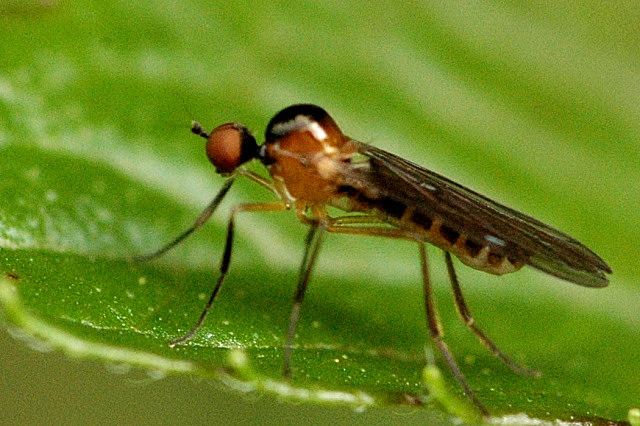
Ocydromia glabricula (Ocydromiinae: Ocydromiini)

Ocydromiinae

- Tribe Bicellariini Sinclair & Cumming, 2006 (could be moved into Hybotinae per Sinclair & Cumming, 2006)
  - Bicellaria Macquart, 1823
  - Hoplocyrtoma Melander, 1928
  - Leptocyrtoma Saigusa, 1986
- Tribe Ocydromiini
  - Abocciputa Plant, 1989
  - Apterodromia Oldroyd, 1949
  - Austropeza Collin, 1928
  - Chvalaea Papp & Földvári, 2002
  - Hoplopeza Bezzi, 1909
  - Leptodromia Sinclair & Cumming, 2000
  - Leptodromiella Tuomikoski, 1936
  - Leptopeza Macquart, 1834
  - Leptopezella Sinclair & Cumming 2007
  - Neotrichina Cumming, 2000
  - Ocydromia Meigen, 1820
  - Oropezella Collin, 1926
  - Pseudoscelolabes Collin, 1933
  - Scelolabes Philippi, 1865
  - Stylocydromia Saigusa, 1986
- †Ecommocydromia Schlüter 1978 Bezonnais amber, France, Cenomanian
- †Pouillonhybos Ngô-Muller et al. 2020, Burmese amber, Myanmar, Cenomanian

Trichinomyia flavipes

Trichininae Chvála, 1983 (often included in Ocydromiinae)

- Trichina Meigen, 1830
- Trichinomyia Tuomikoski, 1959

Oedaleinae Chvála, 1983

- Allanthalia Melander, 1927
- Anthalia Zetterstedt, 1838
- Euthyneura Macquart, 1836
- Oedalea Meigen, 1820

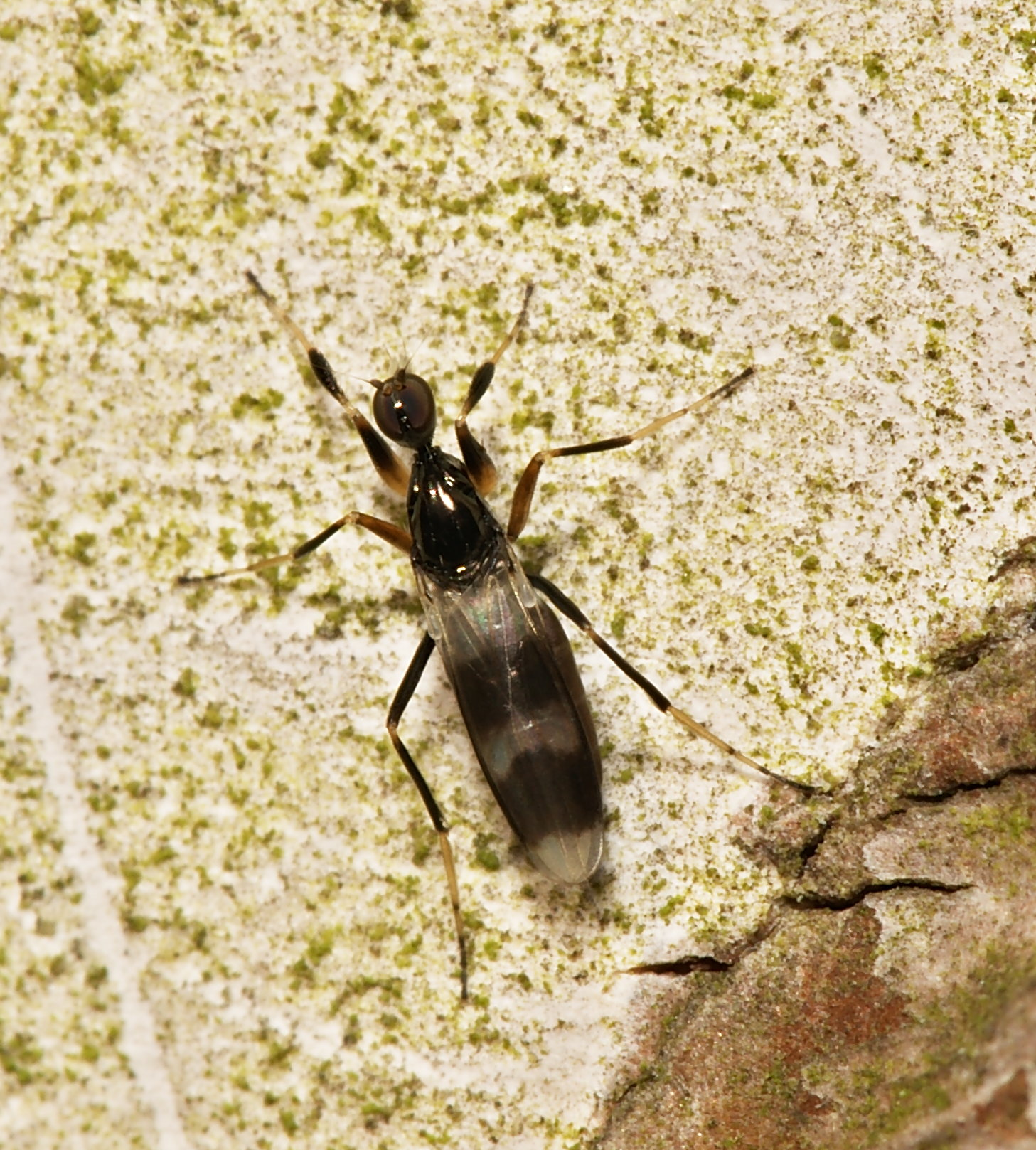
Tachydromia arrogans or closely related species (Tachydromiinae: Tachydromiini)

Tachydromiinae Meigen, 1822

- Tribe Symballophthalmini Bradley, Sinclair & Cumming, 2006
  - Symballophthalmus Becker, 1889
- Tribe Drapetidini Collin, 1961
  - Allodromia Smith, 1962
  - Atodrapetis Plant, 1997
  - Austrodrapetis Smith, 1964
  - Austrodromia Collin, 1961
  - Chaetodromia Chillcott & Teskey, 1983
  - Chersodromia Haliday in Walker, 1851
  - Crossopalpus Bigot, 1857
  - Drapetis Meigen, 1822
  - Dusmetina Gil Collado, 1930
  - Elaphropeza Macquart, 1827
  - Isodrapetis Collin, 1961
  - Megagrapha Melander, 1928
  - Micrempis Melander, 1928
  - Nanodromia Grootaert, 1994
  - Ngaheremyia Plant & Didham, 2006
  - Parallelodromia Sinclair, Cumming & Shamsev 2022
  - Pontodromia Grootaert, 1994
  - Sinodrapetis Yang, Gaimari & Grootaert, 2004
  - Stilpon Loew, 1859
- Tribe Tachydromiini
  - Charadrodromia Melander, 1928
  - Dysaletria Loew, 1864
  - Pieltainia Arias, 1919
  - Platypalpus Macquart, 1827
  - Tachydromia Meigen, 1803
  - Tachyempis Melander, 1928
  - Tachypeza Meigen, 1830

Tachypeza nubila with prey (video, 2m 23s)

- †Archaeodrapetiops Martins-Neto et al. 1992 Tremembé Formation, Brazil, Chattian
- †Cretoplatypalpus Kovalev 1978 Taimyr amber, Russia, Santonian, Canadian amber, Campanian
- †Electrocyrtoma Cockerell 1917 Burmese amber, Myanmar, Cenomanian
- †Eoplatypalpus Shamshev, Vasilenko & Perkovsky 2025 Sakhalinian amber, Russia, Eocene
- †Mesoplatypalpus Grimaldi and Cumming 1999 Canadian amber, Campanian

Stuckenbergomyiinae Sinclair, 2019

- Stuckenbergomyia Smith, 1971

Incertae sedis

- †Grimaldipeza Solórzano-Kraemer et al. 2023 El Soplao, Spain, Middle Albian, La Hoya, Spain, Early Cenomanian
- †Trichinites Hennig 1970 Lebanese amber, Barremian
