= Axel Leonard Melander =

American entomologist (1878–1962)

- Born: June 3, 1878; Chicago, Illinois
- Died: August 14, 1962 (aged 84); Riverside, California
- Education: BS UT Austin, 1901; MS UT Austin, 1902; ScD Harvard, 1914
- Scientific career
- Fields: Entomology
- Institutions: Washington State University; City College of New York
- Thesis: A monograph of the Empididæ of North America (1902)

Axel Leonard Melander (3 June 1878 – 14 August 1962) was an American entomologist specialising in Diptera and Hymenoptera. Specimens collected by Melander are held at the German Entomological Institute and the National Museum of Natural History.

== Educational career ==
He received his BS degree in 1901 and his MS degree on 11 June 1902 from the University of Texas at Austin and his ScD degree from Harvard University in 1914. His master's thesis was titled, "A monograph of the Empididæ of North America." He was a professor at Washington State University and retired as the chairman of the biology department of the City College of New York in 1943 after joining the faculty there on his graduation from Harvard in 1914.
