= List of Pristaulacus species =

This is a list of 132 species in Pristaulacus, a genus of aulacid wasps in the hymenopteran family Aulacidae.

== Pristaulacus species ==
- Pristaulacus absens Smith, 2005^{i c g}
- Pristaulacus acutipennis Kieffer, 1910^{i c g}
- Pristaulacus africanus (Brues, 1924)^{i c g}
- Pristaulacus albitarsatus Sun & Sheng, 2007^{g}
- Pristaulacus albosignatus (Kieffer, 1911)^{i c g}
- Pristaulacus ambiguus (Schletterer, 1890)^{i c g}
- Pristaulacus angularis (Crosskey, 1953)^{i c g}
- Pristaulacus anijimensis ^{g}
- Pristaulacus annulatus (Kieffer, 1911)^{i c g}
- Pristaulacus arcuatus Kieffer, 1904^{i c g}
- Pristaulacus arizonicus (Townes, 1950)^{i c g}
- Pristaulacus arozarenae Ortega & Baez, 1985^{i c g}
- Pristaulacus asiaticus Turrisi & Smith, 2011^{g}
- Pristaulacus barbeyi (Ferrière, 1933)^{i c g}
- Pristaulacus bicornutus (Schletterer, 1890)^{i c g}
- Pristaulacus bilobatus (Provancher, 1878)^{i c g}
- Pristaulacus boninensis Konishi, 1989^{i c g}
- Pristaulacus bradleyi (Brues, 1910)^{i c g}
- Pristaulacus brasiliensis (Kieffer, 1911)^{i c g}
- Pristaulacus californicus (Townes, 1950)^{i c g}
- Pristaulacus canadensis (Townes, 1950)^{i c g}
- Pristaulacus capitalis (Schletterer, 1890)^{i c g}
- Pristaulacus caudatus Szépligeti, 1903^{i c g}
- Pristaulacus chlapowskii Kieffer, 1900^{i c g}
- Pristaulacus cingulatus (Westwood, 1841)^{i c g}
- Pristaulacus colombianus Smith, 2005^{i c g}
- Pristaulacus compressus (Spinola, 1808)^{i c g}
- Pristaulacus comptipennis Enderlein, 1912^{i c g}
- Pristaulacus concolor (Schletterer, 1890)^{i c g}
- Pristaulacus cordatus (Schletterer, 1890)^{i c g}
- Pristaulacus cordiformis (Crosskey, 1953)^{i c g}
- Pristaulacus curryi Jennings, Austin & Stevens, 2004^{i c g}
- Pristaulacus davisi Jennings, Austin & Stevens, 2004^{i c g}
- Pristaulacus decemdentatus Kieffer, 1906^{i c g}
- Pristaulacus disjunctus Kieffer, 1904^{i c g}
- Pristaulacus duporti Kieffer, 1921^{i c g}
- Pristaulacus editus (Cresson, 1880)^{i c g b}
- Pristaulacus emarginaticeps Turner, 1922^{i c g}
- Pristaulacus erythrocephalus Cameron, 1905^{i c g}
- Pristaulacus excisus (Turner, 1922)^{i c g}
- Pristaulacus fasciatipennis Cameron, 1906^{i c g}
- Pristaulacus fasciatus (Say, 1829)^{i c g b}
- Pristaulacus femurrubrum Smith, 2005^{i c g}
- Pristaulacus fiebrigi Brèthes, 1909^{i c g}
- Pristaulacus flavicrurus (Bradley, 1901)^{i c g b}
- Pristaulacus flavipennis (Cameron, 1887)^{i c g}
- Pristaulacus flavoguttatus (Westwood, 1851)^{i c g}
- Pristaulacus formosus (Westwood, 1868)^{i c g}
- Pristaulacus foxleei (Townes, 1950)^{i c g b}
- Pristaulacus fulvus (Turner, 1918)^{i c g}
- Pristaulacus fuscocostalis Turner, 1918^{i c g}
- Pristaulacus galitae (Gribodo, 1879)^{i c g}
- Pristaulacus gibbator (Thunberg, 1822)^{i c g}
- Pristaulacus gloriator (Fabricius, 1804)^{i c g}
- Pristaulacus guerini (Westwood, 1851)^{i c g}
- Pristaulacus haemorrhoidalis (Westwood, 1851)^{i c g}
- Pristaulacus haemorrhoidellus (Westwood, 1868)^{i c g}
- Pristaulacus holtzi (Schulz, 1906)^{i c g}
- Pristaulacus holzschuhi Madl, 1990^{i c g}
- Pristaulacus immaculatus Kieffer, 1904^{i c g}
- Pristaulacus insularis Konishi, 1990^{i c g}
- Pristaulacus intermedius Uchida, 1932^{i c g}
- Pristaulacus iosephi Turrisi & Madl, 2013^{g}
- Pristaulacus iridipennis (Cameron, 1900)^{i c g}
- Pristaulacus japonicus Turrisi & Watanabe^{g}
- Pristaulacus karinulus Smith, 2001^{i c g}
- Pristaulacus kiunga Jennings & Austin^{g}
- Pristaulacus kostylevi (Alekseev, 1986)^{i c g}
- Pristaulacus krombeini Smith, 1997^{i c g}
- Pristaulacus laloki Jennings & Austin^{g}
- Pristaulacus lateritius (Shuckard, 1841)^{i c g}
- Pristaulacus leviceps (Kieffer, 1911)^{i c g}
- Pristaulacus lindae Turrisi, 2000^{i c g}
- Pristaulacus longicornis Kieffer, 1911^{i c g}
- Pristaulacus maculatus (Schletterer, 1890)^{i c g}
- Pristaulacus major Szépligeti, 1903^{i c g}
- Pristaulacus mandibularis Brues, 1933^{i c g}
- Pristaulacus melleus (Cresson, 1879)^{i c g b}
- Pristaulacus memnonius Sun & Sheng, 2007^{g}
- Pristaulacus minor (Cresson, 1880)^{i c g b}
- Pristaulacus montanus (Cresson, 1879)^{i c g b}
- Pristaulacus morawitzi (Semenow, 1892)^{i c g}
- Pristaulacus mouldsi Jennings, Austin & Stevens, 2004^{i c g}
- Pristaulacus mourguesi Maneval, 1935^{i c g}
- Pristaulacus muticus Kieffer, 1904^{i c g}
- Pristaulacus niger (Shuckard, 1841)^{i c g b}
- Pristaulacus nigripes Kieffer, 1911^{i c g}
- Pristaulacus nobilei Turrisi & Smith, 2011^{g}
- Pristaulacus nobilis (Westwood, 1868)^{i c g}
- Pristaulacus occidentalis (Cresson, 1879)^{i c g b}
- Pristaulacus oregonus (Townes, 1950)^{i c g}
- Pristaulacus ornatus Kieffer, 1913^{i c g}
- Pristaulacus pacificus (Cresson, 1879)^{i c g}
- Pristaulacus patrati (Audinet-Serville, 1833)^{i c g}
- Pristaulacus pieli Kieffer, 1924^{i c g}
- Pristaulacus polychromus Kieffer, 1906^{i c g}
- Pristaulacus porcatus Sun & Sheng, 2007^{g}
- Pristaulacus praevolans (Brues, 1923)^{i c g}
- Pristaulacus proximus Kieffer, 1906^{i c g}
- Pristaulacus punctatus Smith, 2005^{i c g}
- Pristaulacus resutorivorus (Westwood, 1851)^{i c g b}
- Pristaulacus rohweri Brues, 1910^{i c g}
- Pristaulacus rubidus (Schletterer, 1890)^{i c g}
- Pristaulacus rubriventer (Philippi, 1873)^{i c g}
- Pristaulacus ruficeps (Westwood, 1851)^{i c g}
- Pristaulacus ruficollis (Cameron, 1887)^{i c g}
- Pristaulacus rufipes Enderlein, 1912^{i c g}
- Pristaulacus rufipilosus Uchida, 1932^{i c g}
- Pristaulacus rufitarsis (Cresson, 1864)^{i c g b}
- Pristaulacus rufobalteatus (Cameron, 1907)^{i c g}
- Pristaulacus rufus (Westwood, 1841)^{i c g}
- Pristaulacus ryukyuiensis Konishi, 1990^{i c g}
- Pristaulacus secundus (Cockerell, 1916)^{i c g}
- Pristaulacus sexdentatus Kieffer, 1904^{i c g}
- Pristaulacus sibiricola (Semenow, 1892)^{i c g}
- Pristaulacus signatus (Shuckard, 1841)^{i c g}
- Pristaulacus spinifer (Westwood, 1868)^{i c g}
- Pristaulacus stephanoides (Westwood, 1841)^{i c g}
- Pristaulacus stigmaterus (Cresson, 1864)^{i c g}
- Pristaulacus stigmaticus (Westwood, 1868)^{i c g b}
- Pristaulacus strangaliae Rohwer, 1917^{i c g b}
- Pristaulacus superbus Turrisi & Konishi^{g}
- Pristaulacus takakuwai Turrisi & Watanabe^{g}
- Pristaulacus tonkinensis (Turner, 1919)^{i c g}
- Pristaulacus torridus (Bradley, 1908)^{i c g}
- Pristaulacus tricolor Szépligeti, 1903^{i c g}
- Pristaulacus tridentatus Smith, 2005^{i c g}
- Pristaulacus tuberculiceps Turner, 1919^{i c g}
- Pristaulacus variegatus (Shuckard, 1841)^{i c g}
- Pristaulacus violaceus (Bradley, 1905)^{i c g}
- Pristaulacus zhejiangensis He & Ma, 2002^{i c g}
- Pristaulacus zonatipennis Roman, 1917^{i c g}

Data sources: i = ITIS, c = Catalogue of Life, g = GBIF, b = Bugguide.net
