= List of Platypalpus species =

This is a list of 580 species in the genus Platypalpus.

== Platypalpus species ==
- Platypalpus abagoensis Kustov, Shamshev & Grootaert, 2014
- Platypalpus academicus Barták & Kubík, 2018
- Platypalpus achlytarsis Chillcott, 1962
- Platypalpus aciculatus (Smith, 1967)
- Platypalpus acuminatus Saigusa & Yang, 2003
- Platypalpus acutatus Yang & Li, 2005
- Platypalpus acuticornis (Collin, 1960)
- Platypalpus aeneus (Macquart, 1823)
- Platypalpus aequalis Loew, 1864
- Platypalpus aequicornis Melander, 1928
- Platypalpus aerivagus (Séguy, 1941)
- Platypalpus agilis (Meigen, 1822)
- Platypalpus agnitus (Collin, 1960)
- Platypalpus akhunensis Kusov, Shamshev & Grootaert, 2015
- Platypalpus alamaculatus Yang & Merz, 2005
- Platypalpus albescens (Collin, 1941)
- Platypalpus albicornis (Zetterstedt, 1842)
- Platypalpus albidifacies Chvála, 1975
- Platypalpus albifacies (Collin, 1926)
- Platypalpus albiseta (Meigen, 1806)
- Platypalpus albistylus Chvála, 1989
- Platypalpus albocapillatus (Fallén, 1815)
- Platypalpus albomicans (Bezzi, 1892)
- Platypalpus alexippus Walker, 1849
- Platypalpus algirus Macquart, 1847
- Platypalpus aliterolamellatus Kovalev, 1971
- Platypalpus alluaudi Grootaert & Chvála, 1992
- Platypalpus alpigenus (Strobl, 1893)
- Platypalpus alpinus Chvála, 1971
- Platypalpus alter (Collin, 1961)
- Platypalpus altuum Frey, 1958
- Platypalpus alumnus Melander, 1928
- Platypalpus amankutanensis Barták & Shamshev, 2015
- Platypalpus analis (Meigen, 1830)
- Platypalpus anatolicus Chillcott, 1962
- Platypalpus andalusiacus (Strobl, 1899)
- Platypalpus angustifrons Frey, 1943
- Platypalpus annularis Bezzi, 1909
- Platypalpus annulatus (Fallén, 1815)
- Platypalpus annulipes (Meigen, 1822)
- Platypalpus annulitarsis Kovalev, 1978
- Platypalpus anomalicerus (Becker, 1902)
- Platypalpus anomalinervis Chvála, 1971
- Platypalpus anomalitarsis Chvála & Kovalev, 1974
- Platypalpus anomalus Barták & Kubík, 2018
- Platypalpus antennalis Smith, 1962
- Platypalpus apicalis Loew, 1864
- Platypalpus apiciflavus Saigusa & Yang, 2003
- Platypalpus apiciniger Saigusa & Yang, 2003
- Platypalpus approximatus (Becker, 1902)
- Platypalpus arcticus Melander, 1928
- Platypalpus argenteomicans (Becker, 1908)
- Platypalpus argenticapillatus Kovalev, 1978
- Platypalpus argenticeps (Meijere, 1914)
- Platypalpus argentiseta (Collin, 1969)
- Platypalpus argyroceratus (Collin, 1960)
- Platypalpus aristatus (Collin, 1926)
- Platypalpus armillatus Melander, 1928
- Platypalpus arnaudi (Melander, 1960)
- Platypalpus articulatoides (Frey, 1918)
- Platypalpus articulatus Macquart, 1828
- Platypalpus arzanovi Kustov, Shamshev & Grootaert, 2014
- Platypalpus asniensis Grootaert & Chvála, 1992
- Platypalpus ater (Wahlberg, 1844)
- Platypalpus aurantiacus (Collin, 1926)
- Platypalpus australis Grootaert, 1995
- Platypalpus australominutus Grootaert, 1989
- Platypalpus awarensis Grootaert, 1984
- Platypalpus baechlii Grootaert, 1992
- Platypalpus baezi Grootaert & Chvála, 1992
- Platypalpus baldensis (Strobl, 1899)
- Platypalpus ballistrarius Melander, 1928
- Platypalpus ballucatus Melander, 1928
- Platypalpus balticus Kovalev, 1971
- Platypalpus baotianmanensis Yang, An & Gao, 2002
- Platypalpus barotsei Smith, 1969
- Platypalpus bartaki Chvála, 1989
- Platypalpus basiflavus Yang & Yang, 1989
- Platypalpus beijingensis Yang & Yu, 2005
- Platypalpus bellatulus Yang & Yang, 1989
- Platypalpus bequaerti Grootaert & Chvála, 1992
- Platypalpus bequaertoides Grootaert, 1995
- Platypalpus biapicalis Weber, 1972
- Platypalpus bicoloratus Chvála, 1981
- Platypalpus bicornis Melander, 1928
- Platypalpus bilobatus Weber, 1972
- Platypalpus bimaculatus Yang, Wang, Zhu & Zhang, 2010
- Platypalpus bipunctatus Kovalev, 1978
- Platypalpus blascoi Grootaert, 1995
- Platypalpus bohousi Barták & Kubík, 2018
- Platypalpus bolikoi Grootaert & Shamshev, 2014
- Platypalpus bomiensis Yang & Yang, 1989
- Platypalpus boreoalpinus Frey, 1943
- Platypalpus brachystylus (Bezzi, 1892)
- Platypalpus breviarista Li, Gao, Lin, Chen & Yang, 2021
- Platypalpus brevicornis (Zetterstedt, 1842)
- Platypalpus breviprocerus Yang, Wang & Zhang, 2018
- Platypalpus brevis Yang, Wang, Zhu & Zhang, 2010
- Platypalpus breviseta Li, Chang, Zhang & Yang, 2019
- Platypalpus brunettii Melander, 1928
- Platypalpus calceatus (Meigen, 1822)
- Platypalpus caligaris Melander, 1928
- Platypalpus caligatus Melander, 1902
- Platypalpus callithrix Melander, 1928
- Platypalpus canariensis Grootaert & Chvála, 1992
- Platypalpus candicans (Fallén, 1815)
- Platypalpus candidiseta (Bezzi, 1912)
- Platypalpus canus Melander, 1902
- Platypalpus capensis Smith, 1967
- Platypalpus carectorum Chillcott, 1962
- Platypalpus carlestolrai Grootaert & Chvála, 1992
- Platypalpus caroli Grootaert, 1987
- Platypalpus carpathicus Kovalev & Chvála, 1985
- Platypalpus carteri (Collin, 1926)
- Platypalpus caucasicus Kovalev, 1967
- Platypalpus cellarius Melander, 1928
- Platypalpus ceylonensis Melander, 1928
- Platypalpus chilensis Philippi, 1865
- Platypalpus chillcotti Chvála, 1981
- Platypalpus chillocotti Chvála, 1981
- Platypalpus chimganensis Barták & Shamshev, 2015
- Platypalpus chionochaeta (Bezzi, 1904)
- Platypalpus chishuiensis Yang, Zhu & An, 2006
- Platypalpus chrysonotus (Strobl, 1899)
- Platypalpus churchillensis Chillcott, 1962
- Platypalpus ciliaris (Fallén, 1816)
- Platypalpus cilitarsis Frey, 1943
- Platypalpus cinereovittatus (Strobl, 1899)
- Platypalpus clarandus (Collin, 1926)
- Platypalpus clypeatus Kovalev, 1973
- Platypalpus coarctatiformis Frey, 1943
- Platypalpus coei Bequaert, 1962
- Platypalpus cognatus (Collin, 1949)
- Platypalpus collini (Chvála, 1966)
- Platypalpus commendatus (Becker, 1914)
- Platypalpus commutatus (Strobl, 1893)
- Platypalpus commutitoides Barták & Shamshev, 2015
- Platypalpus concavus Yang & Yang, 1989
- Platypalpus concitatus Meunier, 1908
- Platypalpus confiformis Chvála, 1971
- Platypalpus confinis (Zetterstedt, 1842)
- Platypalpus continguus Melander, 1928
- Platypalpus convergens Yang, Merz & Grootaert, 2006
- Platypalpus coquilletti Melander, 1924
- Platypalpus cothurnatus Macquart, 1828
- Platypalpus crassifemoris (Fitch, 1856)
- Platypalpus crassifemur Li, Chang, Zhang & Yang, 2019
- Platypalpus crassipes Chvála, 1975
- Platypalpus crassiseta (Strobl, 1906)
- Platypalpus crepodarius Melander, 1928
- Platypalpus croatiensis Grootaert & Chvála, 1992
- Platypalpus cruralis (Collin, 1961)
- Platypalpus cryptospina (Frey, 1909)
- Platypalpus cubanicus Stark, 1993
- Platypalpus cuipennis Melander, 1924
- Platypalpus cummingi Shamshev & Grootaert, 2012
- Platypalpus cursitans (Fabricius, 1775)
- Platypalpus curvispinus Yang & Yang, 2003
- Platypalpus cylleneus Grootaert & Alexiou, 2020
- Platypalpus dalmatinus (Strobl, 1902)
- Platypalpus dalongtanus Yang & Li, 2011
- Platypalpus debilis Loew, 1863
- Platypalpus decolor Melander, 1928
- Platypalpus desertorum (Becker, 1907)
- Platypalpus dessarti Grootaert, 1983
- Platypalpus didymus Huo, Zhang & Yang, 2010
- Platypalpus digitatus Yang, An & Gao, 2002
- Platypalpus dilatatovittatus (Strobl, 1910)
- Platypalpus diminuticornis Barták & Kubík, 2018
- Platypalpus direptor Melander, 1928
- Platypalpus discifer Loew, 1863
- Platypalpus dissimilipes Melander, 1928
- Platypalpus distichus Grootaert & Chvála, 1992
- Platypalpus diversipes Coquillett, 1900
- Platypalpus divisus Walker, 1852
- Platypalpus dolichopeza Frey, 1943
- Platypalpus dongae Li, Chang, Zhang & Yang, 2019
- Platypalpus dursuni Barták & Kubík, 2018
- Platypalpus ecalceatus (Zetterstedt, 1838)
- Platypalpus ementitus (Collin, 1928)
- Platypalpus enervatus Melander, 1928
- Platypalpus engadinicus (Mik, 1896)
- Platypalpus eshowensis Smith, 1969
- Platypalpus eumelaenus (Mik, 1884)
- Platypalpus eumerus Bezzi, 1909
- Platypalpus euneurus Yang & Yang, 1989
- Platypalpus eversoris Meunier, 1908
- Platypalpus excavatus Yang & Yao, 2007
- Platypalpus exilis (Meigen, 1822)
- Platypalpus eximius (Oldenberg, 1924)
- Platypalpus fai Grootaert & Shamshev, 2006
- Platypalpus falleni Chvála, 1981
- Platypalpus farabiensis Shamshev, 1998
- Platypalpus fasciatus (Meigen, 1822)
- Platypalpus fasciventris Melander, 1928
- Platypalpus fenestella Kovalev, 1971
- Platypalpus ferrugineus Brunetti, 1913
- Platypalpus firensis Grootaert & Chvála, 1992
- Platypalpus flammifer Melander, 1924
- Platypalpus flavicornis (Meigen, 1822)
- Platypalpus flavicoxis (Becker, 1907)
- Platypalpus flavidorsalis Yang, Wang, Zhu & Zhang, 2010
- Platypalpus flavilateralis Yang, Wang, Zhu & Zhang, 2010
- Platypalpus flavirostris Loew, 1864
- Platypalpus flavirostris var. dilutior Melander, 1928
- Platypalpus flaviseta Chvála, 1973
- Platypalpus flavisetosus Li, Chang, Zhang & Yang, 2019
- Platypalpus formosanus Frey, 1943
- Platypalpus fratercula Smith, 1969
- Platypalpus fuscicornis (Zetterstedt, 1842)
- Platypalpus fuscohalteratus Melander, 1924
- Platypalpus fusicnemis Grootaert & Chvála, 1992
- Platypalpus gaemluang Grootaert & Shamshev, 2006
- Platypalpus gatti Grootaert, 1995
- Platypalpus gazaryani Kustov, Shamshev & Grootaert, 2014
- Platypalpus gentilis Brunetti, 1913
- Platypalpus gesticulor Melander, 1928
- Platypalpus glacialis Melander, 1928
- Platypalpus gracilipes Smith, 1967
- Platypalpus graecoides Barták & Kubík, 2015
- Platypalpus graecus Grootaert & Chvála, 1992
- Platypalpus granadensis Chvála, 1981
- Platypalpus grandensis Chvála, 1981
- Platypalpus gravidus Melander, 1902
- Platypalpus grilloi Stark, 1993
- Platypalpus guangdongensis Yang, Merz & Grootaert, 2006
- Platypalpus guangxiensis Yang & Yang, 1992
- Platypalpus guanshanus Yang, Wang, Zhu & Zhang, 2010
- Platypalpus hackmani Chvála, 1972
- Platypalpus hallensis Grootaert & Stark, 1997
- Platypalpus halli Grootaert & Chvála, 1992
- Platypalpus hamulatus Yang & Yang, 1989
- Platypalpus harpestylis Chillcott, 1962
- Platypalpus harpiger Melander, 1924
- Platypalpus hastatus Melander, 1902
- Platypalpus hebeiensis Yang & Weihai, 2005
- Platypalpus hemispinosus Grootaert, 1995
- Platypalpus henanensis Saigusa & Yang, 2003
- Platypalpus hians Melander, 1902
- Platypalpus hirsutus (Collin, 1941)
- Platypalpus hispanicus (Strobl, 1899)
- Platypalpus holosericus Melander, 1924
- Platypalpus hualuang Grootaert & Shamshev, 2006
- Platypalpus hubeiensis Yang & Yang, 1997
- Platypalpus hui Yang, An & Gao, 2002
- Platypalpus hyaenoides Melander, 1928
- Platypalpus ibericus Barták & Kubík, 2016
- Platypalpus ikoso Grootaert & Shamshev, 2014
- Platypalpus immaculatus (Becker, 1902)
- Platypalpus impexus Melander, 1902
- Platypalpus impololoi Smith, 1969
- Platypalpus incertoides Grootaert & Chvála, 1992
- Platypalpus incertus (Collin, 1926)
- Platypalpus incurvus Melander, 1902
- Platypalpus inermifemur Smith, 1969
- Platypalpus inexpectatus Smith & Chvála, 1976
- Platypalpus infectus (Collin, 1926)
- Platypalpus inferialis Melander, 1928
- Platypalpus ingenuus (Collin, 1926)
- Platypalpus innocuus Smith, 1967
- Platypalpus inops Melander, 1902
- Platypalpus insperatus Kovalev, 1971
- Platypalpus interfectoris Meunier, 1908
- Platypalpus interstinctus (Collin, 1926)
- Platypalpus isaanensis Grootaert & Shamshev, 2006
- Platypalpus isabellae Grootaert, 1984
- Platypalpus itoi Frey, 1955
- Platypalpus javieri Grootaert, 1995
- Platypalpus juvenis Melander, 1928
- Platypalpus kamtschaticus Frey, 1943
- Platypalpus kamyshanovensis Kustov, Shamshev & Grootaert, 2014
- Platypalpus kandybinae Shamshev & Grootaert, 2003
- Platypalpus kasparyani Shamshev, 1999
- Platypalpus kaszabi Kovalev, 1978
- Platypalpus kintrishiensis Kusov, Shamshev & Grootaert, 2015
- Platypalpus kirtlingensis Grootaert, 1986
- Platypalpus kosi (Smith, 1965)
- Platypalpus kovalevi Chvála, 1988
- Platypalpus krisi Grootaert & Van de Velde, 1988
- Platypalpus kurilensis Shamshev, 1999
- Platypalpus lacertosus Melander, 1928
- Platypalpus lacteiseta (Collin, 1922)
- Platypalpus laestadianorum (Frey, 1913)
- Platypalpus laetabilis Melander, 1928
- Platypalpus laetus Loew, 1864
- Platypalpus lantsovi Kusov, Shamshev & Grootaert, 2015
- Platypalpus laohegouanus Li, Chang, Zhang & Yang, 2019
- Platypalpus lapponicus Frey, 1943
- Platypalpus latemi Grootaert, 1983
- Platypalpus lateralis Loew, 1864
- Platypalpus latericius (Becker, 1914)
- Platypalpus laticinctus Walker, 1852
- Platypalpus latistrigata (Meijere, 1924)
- Platypalpus layiaphilus Shamshev & Grootaert, 2012
- Platypalpus leleji Shamshev, 1999
- Platypalpus lesinensis (Strobl, 1893)
- Platypalpus leucarista Kovalev, 1978
- Platypalpus leucocephalus (Roser, 1840)
- Platypalpus leucothrix (Strobl, 1910)
- Platypalpus lhasaensis Yang & Yang, 1989
- Platypalpus lii Yang & Yang, 1989
- Platypalpus loewi Smith, 1969
- Platypalpus lokonda Grootaert & Shamshev, 2014
- Platypalpus longicauda Grootaert & Chvála, 1992
- Platypalpus longicornioides Chvála, 1972
- Platypalpus longicornis (Meigen, 1822)
- Platypalpus longimanus (Corti, 1907)
- Platypalpus longirostris (Bezzi, 1912)
- Platypalpus longiseta (Zetterstedt, 1842)
- Platypalpus luctator Melander, 1928
- Platypalpus lupatus Melander, 1902
- Platypalpus luteicornis (Meigen, 1838)
- Platypalpus luteipes Zuskova, 1966
- Platypalpus luteoloides Grootaert, 1983
- Platypalpus luteolus (Collin, 1926)
- Platypalpus lutescens (Collin, 1941)
- Platypalpus luteus (Meigen, 1804)
- Platypalpus lyneborgi Chvála, 1981
- Platypalpus lyristes Melander, 1928
- Platypalpus macropalpus (Strobl, 1899)
- Platypalpus macropygus Frey, 1943
- Platypalpus macula (Zetterstedt, 1842)
- Platypalpus maculifemoratus Melander, 1928
- Platypalpus maculifemur (Meijere, 1913)
- Platypalpus maculipes (Meigen, 1822)
- Platypalpus major (Zetterstedt, 1842)
- Platypalpus makoaensis Smith, 1967
- Platypalpus malagonensis Grootaert & Chvála, 1992
- Platypalpus malokurilensis Shamshev, 1999
- Platypalpus malotiensis Smith, 1969
- Platypalpus maltensis Grootaert & Chvála, 1992
- Platypalpus manjano Grootaert & Shamshev, 2014
- Platypalpus mankoosi Smith, 1969
- Platypalpus manni Chillcott, 1962
- Platypalpus maoershanensis Yang & Merz, 2005
- Platypalpus marcosbaezi Grootaert & Chvála, 1992
- Platypalpus masoni Chillcott, 1962
- Platypalpus medialis Yang, Wang, Zhu & Zhang, 2010
- Platypalpus melancholicus (Collin, 1961)
- Platypalpus melanocerus Melander, 1928
- Platypalpus melanogaster Melander, 1928
- Platypalpus melleus Melander, 1928
- Platypalpus mesogrammus Loew, 1863
- Platypalpus microcerus Melander, 1928
- Platypalpus microphona (Melander, 1928)
- Platypalpus mikii (Becker, 1890)
- Platypalpus mimus Melander, 1928
- Platypalpus minor Li, Gao, Lin, Chen & Yang, 2021
- Platypalpus minutimontanus Smith, 1969
- Platypalpus minutissimus (Strobl, 1899)
- Platypalpus minutus (Meigen, 1804)
- Platypalpus moceki Barták & Kubík, 2018
- Platypalpus mollis Melander, 1928
- Platypalpus mollitus Collin, 1933
- Platypalpus monegrensis Grootaert, 1995
- Platypalpus montenegrensis Bequaert, 1962
- Platypalpus monticola Melander, 1902
- Platypalpus morgei Chvála, 1981
- Platypalpus mosticensis Barták & Kubík, 2016
- Platypalpus msingi Smith, 1967
- Platypalpus multisetosus (Bezzi, 1899)
- Platypalpus murphyi Chillcott, 1962
- Platypalpus nanus (Oldenberg, 1924)
- Platypalpus narangi (Smith, 1965)
- Platypalpus neberdzaensis Kustov, Shamshev & Grootaert, 2014
- Platypalpus negrobovi Grootaert, Kustov & Shamshev, 2012
- Platypalpus neixiangensis Yang, An & Gao, 2002
- Platypalpus ngomensis Smith, 1969
- Platypalpus nigellus (Collin, 1969)
- Platypalpus niger (Meigen, 1804)
- Platypalpus nigricolor Merz & Chvála, 1998
- Platypalpus nigricoxa (Mik, 1884)
- Platypalpus nigrimanus Strobl, 1880
- Platypalpus nigrinus (Meigen, 1822)
- Platypalpus nigritarsis (Fallén, 1816)
- Platypalpus nigrosetosus (Strobl, 1893)
- Platypalpus nitidipleura Melander, 1928
- Platypalpus niveiseta (Zetterstedt, 1842)
- Platypalpus niveisetoides Chvála, 1973
- Platypalpus niveocapillatus Chvála, 1973
- Platypalpus niyazovi Shamshev, 1998
- Platypalpus nonstriatus (Strobl, 1900)
- Platypalpus norvegicus Grootaert & Jonassen, 1991
- Platypalpus notatus (Meigen, 1822)
- Platypalpus novakii (Strobl, 1893)
- Platypalpus nuadkhao Grootaert & Shamshev, 2006
- Platypalpus nudithorax Chvála, 1975
- Platypalpus obscuratoides (Engel, 1939)
- Platypalpus obscuripes (Strobl, 1899)
- Platypalpus obscuroides Barták & Grootaert, 2021
- Platypalpus obscurus (Roser, 1840)
- Platypalpus ochricollis Melander, 1928
- Platypalpus ochrocera (Collin, 1961)
- Platypalpus oculeus Melander, 1928
- Platypalpus odintsovi Kustov, Shamshev & Grootaert, 2014
- Platypalpus optivus (Collin, 1926)
- Platypalpus oribiensis Smith, 1969
- Platypalpus oriens Melander, 1928
- Platypalpus orientalis Brunetti, 1913
- Platypalpus ornatipes (Bigot, 1891)
- Platypalpus orphnus Collin, 1933
- Platypalpus ostiorum (Becker, 1902)
- Platypalpus ozerovi Shamshev, 1999
- Platypalpus pachycera (Collin, 1949)
- Platypalpus pachycnemus Loew, 1864
- Platypalpus palavensis Chvála, 1989
- Platypalpus pallescens Kovalev, 1979
- Platypalpus pallidicornis (Collin, 1926)
- Platypalpus pallidicoxa (Frey, 1913)
- Platypalpus pallidiseta Kovalev, 1978
- Platypalpus palliditibiae Brunetti, 1913
- Platypalpus pallidiventris (Meigen, 1822)
- Platypalpus pallipes (Fallén, 1815)
- Platypalpus pallipilosus Saigusa & Yang, 2003
- Platypalpus palmeni Frey, 1943
- Platypalpus paluster Chillcott, 1962
- Platypalpus papillatus Collin, 1933
- Platypalpus parvicauda (Collin, 1926)
- Platypalpus paulseni Philippi, 1865
- Platypalpus pectinator Melander, 1924
- Platypalpus pectoralis (Fallén, 1815)
- Platypalpus pedestris (Becker, 1907)
- Platypalpus penesmirnovi Barták & Shamshev, 2015
- Platypalpus perimerus Melander, 1928
- Platypalpus persephone Collin, 1933
- Platypalpus perspiquus (Collin, 1960)
- Platypalpus phomyaaw Grootaert & Shamshev, 2006
- Platypalpus pictipennis Bezzi, 1909
- Platypalpus pictitarsis (Becker, 1902)
- Platypalpus pilatus Melander, 1928
- Platypalpus pilifer Grootaert & Weele, 2020
- Platypalpus pilosus Grootaert & Chvála, 1992
- Platypalpus pingqianus Yang & Li, 2011
- Platypalpus planti Grootaert, 1995
- Platypalpus pluto Melander, 1902
- Platypalpus podocarpi (Becker, 1914)
- Platypalpus politellus Melander, 1928
- Platypalpus politus (Collin, 1926)
- Platypalpus politus var. nitens Melander, 1928
- Platypalpus porrectus Melander, 1924
- Platypalpus postpositus Melander, 1928
- Platypalpus praecinctus (Collin, 1926)
- Platypalpus pragensis Chvála, 1989
- Platypalpus preagilis Grootaert & Chvála, 1992
- Platypalpus predatoris Meunier, 1908
- Platypalpus prorsus Melander, 1928
- Platypalpus proserpina Bezzi, 1909
- Platypalpus pseudoalter Raffone, 2005
- Platypalpus pseudobicolor (Strobl, 1910)
- Platypalpus pseudociliaris (Strobl, 1910)
- Platypalpus pseudoexiguus (Strobl, 1909)
- Platypalpus pseudofulvipes (Frey, 1909)
- Platypalpus pseudomaculipes (Strobl, 1899)
- Platypalpus pseudorapidus Kovalev, 1971
- Platypalpus pseudosilvahumidus Kusov, Shamshev & Grootaert, 2015
- Platypalpus pseudounguiculatus (Strobl, 1909)
- Platypalpus pubescens Melander, 1928
- Platypalpus pudens Melander, 1928
- Platypalpus puerinus Melander, 1928
- Platypalpus pulicarius (Meigen, 1830)
- Platypalpus pulverulentus Melander, 1928
- Platypalpus pygialis Chvála, 1973
- Platypalpus pyrenaicus (Séguy, 1941)
- Platypalpus pyreneensis Barták & Kubík, 2015
- Platypalpus quadrimaculatus Smith, 1962
- Platypalpus quadriseta Collin, 1933
- Platypalpus quinlani (Smith, 1965)
- Platypalpus rapidoides Chvála, 1975
- Platypalpus rapidus (Meigen, 1822)
- Platypalpus recurvus Melander, 1928
- Platypalpus rhodesiensis Smith, 1969
- Platypalpus rhodosensis Grootaert & Chvála, 1992
- Platypalpus richardsi Chillcott, 1962
- Platypalpus ringdahli (Chvála, 1975)
- Platypalpus riojaensis Chvála, 1981
- Platypalpus rossicus Kovalev, 1977
- Platypalpus rubefactus Melander, 1928
- Platypalpus ruficornis (Roser, 1840)
- Platypalpus rufiventris Melander, 1902
- Platypalpus saffradi Grootaert & Shamshev, 2014
- Platypalpus sagma Barták & Shamshev, 2015
- Platypalpus sahlbergi (Frey, 1909)
- Platypalpus samarkandensis Barták & Shamshev, 2015
- Platypalpus sanguensis (Smith, 1965)
- Platypalpus sasaphilus Shamshev, 1999
- Platypalpus satyriacus Melander, 1928
- Platypalpus scambus (Collin, 1928)
- Platypalpus scandinavicus Chvála, 1972
- Platypalpus seedam Grootaert & Shamshev, 2006
- Platypalpus seeluang Grootaert & Shamshev, 2006
- Platypalpus sejunctus (Collin, 1949)
- Platypalpus septentrionalis Shamshev & Sinclair, 2010
- Platypalpus sericatus Melander, 1928
- Platypalpus seticauda Barták & Kubík, 2018
- Platypalpus shealsi (Smith, 1965)
- Platypalpus shirozui (Saigusa, 1965)
- Platypalpus siamensis Grootaert & Shamshev, 2006
- Platypalpus sichuanensis Yang & Yang, 1993
- Platypalpus silvahumidus Barták & Kubík, 2015
- Platypalpus similis Smith, 1969
- Platypalpus simplicipes Melander, 1928
- Platypalpus simplicitarsis Chvála & Kovalev, 1974
- Platypalpus sinevi Kusov, Shamshev & Grootaert, 2015
- Platypalpus singaporensis Grootaert & Shamshev, 2012
- Platypalpus singularis (Collin, 1960)
- Platypalpus sloveniensis Bequaert, 1962
- Platypalpus smirnovi Kovalev, 1978
- Platypalpus smithi Kovalev & Tokarczyk, 1988
- Platypalpus soccatus Melander, 1928
- Platypalpus soosi Chvála, 1989
- Platypalpus sordidus (Zetterstedt, 1838)
- Platypalpus soror Smith, 1969
- Platypalpus spatenkai Barták & Shamshev, 2015
- Platypalpus spatiosus (Collin, 1928)
- Platypalpus spinicercus Chvála, 1981
- Platypalpus spinosus Melander, 1928
- Platypalpus splendens Melander, 1928
- Platypalpus stabilis (Collin, 1961)
- Platypalpus stackelbergi Kovalev, 1971
- Platypalpus stigma (Collin, 1926)
- Platypalpus stigmatelloides Grootaert & Chvála, 1988
- Platypalpus stigmatellus (Zetterstedt, 1842)
- Platypalpus strakai Chvála, 1989
- Platypalpus striatus Yang & Yang, 1989
- Platypalpus strigifrons (Zetterstedt, 1849)
- Platypalpus stroblii (Mik, 1900)
- Platypalpus styloformis Weber, 1972
- Platypalpus subbrevis (Frey, 1913)
- Platypalpus subcaucasicus Kusov, Shamshev & Grootaert, 2015
- Platypalpus subinfectus Barták & Shamshev, 2015
- Platypalpus sublutescens Barták & Shamshev, 2015
- Platypalpus submicans Frey, 1958
- Platypalpus submicrophona Shamshev & Grootaert, 2012
- Platypalpus subnigrinus Chvála, 1975
- Platypalpus subtectifrons Shamshev & Sinclair, 2010
- Platypalpus subtilis (Collin, 1926)
- Platypalpus subulifer (Meijere, 1914)
- Platypalpus suffasciatus Melander, 1928
- Platypalpus sulcolanatus Smith, 1967
- Platypalpus sutor Melander, 1924
- Platypalpus syletor (Melander, 1928)
- Platypalpus sylvicola (Collin, 1926)
- Platypalpus tachistiformis Melander, 1928
- Platypalpus talaris Melander, 1928
- Platypalpus tanbarkiensis Shamshev & Grootaert, 2012
- Platypalpus tapa (Smith, 1965)
- Platypalpus taplejungensis (Smith, 1965)
- Platypalpus teberdaensis Kusov, Shamshev & Grootaert, 2015
- Platypalpus tectifrons (Becker, 1907)
- Platypalpus tenax Melander, 1928
- Platypalpus tenellus Melander, 1902
- Platypalpus teneriffensis (Becker, 1908)
- Platypalpus tenuis Melander, 1928
- Platypalpus tergestinoides Grootaert & Chvála, 1992
- Platypalpus tergestinus Egger, 1860
- Platypalpus tersus Coquillett, 1895
- Platypalpus testaceus Philippi, 1865
- Platypalpus thaicus Grootaert & Shamshev, 2006
- Platypalpus thyamis (Séguy, 1942)
- Platypalpus tonsus (Collin, 1961)
- Platypalpus triangulatus Yang & Yang, 1989
- Platypalpus trivialis Loew, 1864
- Platypalpus truncatus Chillcott, 1962
- Platypalpus tsitsikama Smith, 1969
- Platypalpus tumidiarista Barták & Shamshev, 2015
- Platypalpus tuomikoskii Chvála, 1972
- Platypalpus turgidus (Becker, 1907)
- Platypalpus uncinatus Melander, 1928
- Platypalpus unguiculatus (Zetterstedt, 1838)
- Platypalpus unguiger Kovalev & Chvála, 1985
- Platypalpus unicus (Collin, 1961)
- Platypalpus univittatus Loew, 1858
- Platypalpus uzbekistanicus Barták & Shamshev, 2015
- Platypalpus valens Melander, 1928
- Platypalpus valgus Melander, 1928
- Platypalpus variegatus Yang & Yang, 1989
- Platypalpus vegetus Frey, 1943
- Platypalpus vegrandis Frey, 1943
- Platypalpus velocipes Frey, 1943
- Platypalpus velox Melander, 1928
- Platypalpus venaticus Melander, 1928
- Platypalpus verbekei Grootaert & Chvála, 1992
- Platypalpus verpus Melander, 1928
- Platypalpus verralli (Collin, 1926)
- Platypalpus versipes Melander, 1928
- Platypalpus versutus Melander, 1924
- Platypalpus vicarius Walker, 1857
- Platypalpus vicinus Smith, 1969
- Platypalpus vierecki Melander, 1902
- Platypalpus villeneuvi (Becker, 1910)
- Platypalpus virgatus Barták & Shamshev, 2015
- Platypalpus vittatus Melander, 1928
- Platypalpus vittiger Melander, 1928
- Platypalpus vividus (Meigen, 1838)
- Platypalpus vockerothi Chvála, 1981
- Platypalpus vulcanicus Frey, 1958
- Platypalpus vulnificus Melander, 1928
- Platypalpus w-maculatus Smith, 1962
- Platypalpus wagneri Grootaert & Chvála, 1992
- Platypalpus wangwushanus Yang, Wang, Zhu & Zhang, 2010
- Platypalpus weberi Chvála, 1989
- Platypalpus wuorentausi Frey, 1943
- Platypalpus xanthochiton Melander, 1928
- Platypalpus xanthodes Yang & Merz, 2005
- Platypalpus xanthopodus Melander, 1928
- Platypalpus xanthopus (Bezzi, 1914)
- Platypalpus xiaowutaiensis Yang & Li, 2005
- Platypalpus xizangenicus Yang & Yang, 1989
- Platypalpus yadinganus Li, Gao, Lin, Chen & Yang, 2021
- Platypalpus yadongensis Yang & Yang, 1989
- Platypalpus yangambensis Grootaert & Shamshev, 2014
- Platypalpus yugoslavensis Bequaert, 1962
- Platypalpus yunnanensis Yang & Yang, 1990
- Platypalpus zeravshanensis Barták & Shamshev, 2015
- Platypalpus zernyi Chvála, 1975
- Platypalpus zetterstedti Chvála, 1971
- Platypalpus zeylanicus (Senior-White, 1922)
- Platypalpus zhangae Yang, Merz & Grootaert, 2006
