= Melleus =

Melleus may refer to:

- Alysson melleus, species of wasp
- Gymnopilus melleus, species of mushroom-forming fungus
- Oenomaus melleus, species of butterfly
- Platypalpus melleus, species of hybotid dance flies
- Pristaulacus melleus, species of wasp
