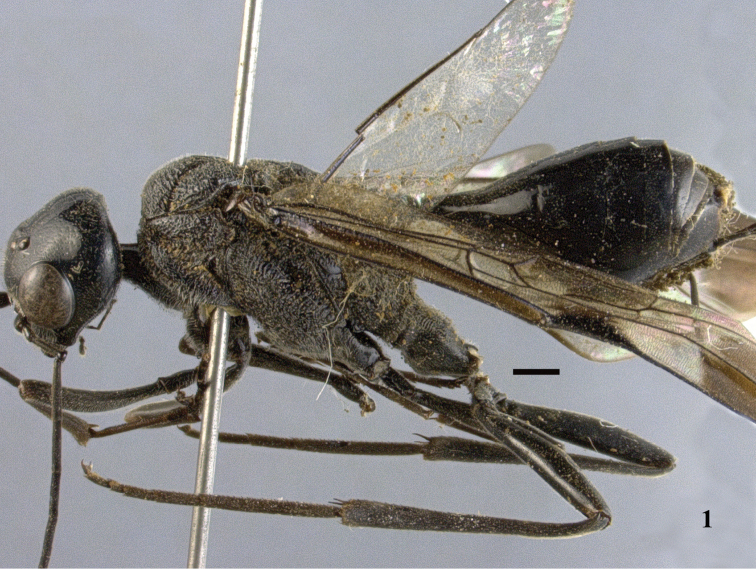
- Aulacus sp.

Scientific classification
- Kingdom: Animalia
- Phylum: Arthropoda
- Class: Insecta
- Order: Hymenoptera
- Family: Aulacidae
- Genus: Aulacus; Jurine, 1807

Synonyms
- Aulacinus Westwood, 1868; Disaulacinus Kieffer, 1910; Disphaeron Dahlbom, 1837; Micraulacinus Kieffer, 1910; Neuraulacinus Kieffer, 1910; Pammegischia Provancher, 1882; Parafoenus Kieffer, 1910; Pycnaulacus Cushman, 1929

= Aulacus =

Genus of wasps

Aulacus is a genus of aulacids, ensigns, and gasteruptiids in the family Aulacidae. There are 77 species of Aulacus.

== Taxonomy and phylogeny ==
This genus was originally described in 1807 by Louis Jurine. It is currently one of two extant genera within the family Aulacidae along with its sister genus, Pristaulacus.

As presently defined, the genus Aulacus has been noted by Turrisi et al. in 2009 as not representing a monophyletic group, instead being a paraphyletic assemblage of species with respect to Pristaulacus. Their research also concluded the need for further studies to split the genus into several monophyletic genera.

== Description and identification ==
Aulacus are generally small auladic wasps. The head lacks an occipital carina, and the tarsal claws are simple. The forewing has vein 2r-m present in contrast to the genus Pristaulacus, which lacks this vein.

== Distribution ==
The genus Aulacus has a nearly worldwide distribution apart from the Afrotropics and Antarctica.

== Behavior ==
While little is known about the biology of the genus as a whole, many species are known to be koinobiont parasitoids of beetles or wood wasps.

== Species ==
The following are 72 of the described species belong to the genus Aulacus:

- Aulacus albimanus (Kieffer, 1911)^{i c g}
- Aulacus amazonicus (Roman, 1917)^{i c g}
- Aulacus aneurus Walkley, 1952^{i c g}
- Aulacus aroueti (Girault, 1926)^{i c g}
- Aulacus atriceps (Kieffer, 1911)^{i c g}
- Aulacus belairensis Jennings, Austin & Stevens, 2004^{i c g}
- Aulacus biroi (Szépligeti, 1903)^{i c g}
- Aulacus bituberculatus Cameron, 1899^{i c g}
- Aulacus braconiformis (Kieffer, 1911)^{i c g}
- Aulacus brasiliensis (Szépligeti, 1903)^{i c g}
- Aulacus braunsi (Kieffer, 1911)^{i c g}
- Aulacus brevicaudus (Cushman, 1929)^{i c g}
- Aulacus brevis Smith, 2005^{i c g}
- Aulacus burquei (Provancher, 1882)^{i c g b}
- Aulacus burwelli Jennings, Austin & Stevens, 2004^{i c g}
- Aulacus cephalus Smith, 2005^{i c g}
- Aulacus coracinus Jennings, Austin & Stevens, 2004^{i c g}
- Aulacus costulatus (Kieffer, 1904)^{i c g}
- Aulacus davidi Kuroda, Konishi, Turrisi & Yamasako, 2020^{j}
- Aulacus digitalis Townes, 1950^{i c g}
- Aulacus dispilis Townes, 1950^{i c g b}
- Aulacus douglasi Jennings, Austin & Stevens, 2004^{i c g}
- Aulacus elegans (Kieffer, 1911)^{i c g}
- Aulacus emineo Jennings, Austin & Stevens, 2004^{i c g}
- Aulacus eocenicus Nel, Waller & De Ploëg, 2004^{i c g}
- Aulacus erythrogaster He & Chen, 2002^{i c g}
- Aulacus festivus (Kieffer, 1911)^{i c g}
- Aulacus flavicornis (Kieffer, 1911)^{i c g}
- Aulacus flavigenis Alekseev, 1986^{i c g j}
- Aulacus flavimanus (Kieffer, 1911)^{i c g}
- Aulacus flindersbaudini Jennings, Austin & Stevens, 2004^{i c g}
- Aulacus forus (Smith, 2001)^{i c g}
- Aulacus fritschii † (Brues, 1933)^{i c g}
- Aulacus fuscicornis Cameron, 1911^{i c g}
- Aulacus fusiger Schletterer, 1890^{i c g}
- Aulacus gaullei (Kieffer, 1904)^{i c g}
- Aulacus grossi Jennings, Austin & Stevens, 2004^{i c g}
- Aulacus houstoni Jennings, Austin & Stevens, 2004^{i c g}
- Aulacus hyalinipennis Westwood, 1841^{i g}
- Aulacus impolitus Smith, 1991^{i c g j}
- Aulacus japonicus Konishi, 1990^{i c g j}
- Aulacus jeoffreyi Alekseev, 1993^{i c g}
- Aulacus kohli Schletterer, 1890^{i c g}
- Aulacus krahmeri Elgueta & Lanfranco, 1994^{i c g}
- Aulacus larisae Sundukov & Lelej, 2015
- Aulacus longiventris (Kieffer, 1911)^{i c g}
- Aulacus lovei (Ashmead, 1901)^{i c g}
- Aulacus machaerophorus Kuroda, Kikuchi & Konishi, 2016 ^{j}
- Aulacus magnus Chen, Turrisi & Xu, 2016^{z}
- Aulacus mcmillani Jennings, Austin & Stevens, 2004^{i c g}
- Aulacus minutus Crosskey, 1953^{i c g}
- Aulacus moerens Westwood, 1868^{i c g}
- Aulacus nigriventris (Kieffer, 1911)^{i c g}
- Aulacus notatus (Szépligeti, 1903)^{i c g}
- Aulacus ochreus Smith, 2005^{i c g}
- Aulacus pallidicaudis (Cameron, 1911)^{i c g}
- Aulacus pallipes Cresson, 1879^{i c g}
- Aulacus pediculatus Schletterer, 1890^{i c g}
- Aulacus philippinensis (Kieffer, 1916)^{i c g}
- Aulacus planiceps (Szépligeti, 1903)^{i c g}
- Aulacus prisculus † (Brues, 1933)^{i c g}
- Aulacus pterostigmatus (Szépligeti, 1903)^{i c g}
- Aulacus schiffi Smith, 1996^{i c g}
- Aulacus schoenitzeri Turrisi, 2005^{i c g}
- Aulacus shizukii Kuroda, Konishi, Turrisi & Yamasako, 2020^{j}
- Aulacus sinensis He & Chen, 2007 ^{j}
- Aulacus striatus Jurine, 1807^{i c g}
- Aulacus thoracicus Westwood, 1841^{i c g}
- Aulacus truncatus (Kieffer, 1911)^{i c g}
- Aulacus uchidai Turrisi & Konishi, 2011 ^{j}
- Aulacus vespiformis (Kieffer, 1911)^{i c g}
- Aulacus westwoodi Kieffer, 1912^{i c g}

Data sources: i = ITIS, c = Catalogue of Life, g = GBIF, b = Bugguide.net, z = Revision of Chinese Aulacidae, j = Revisional Study of Japan, r = Aulacidae in the Russian Far East

=== Nomina nuda ===
There are additionally 4 species names that are considered nomina nuda in Smith's catalog of species.

- Aulacus beckeri Tournier, 1911
- Aulacus plurimaculatus Tournier, 1911
- Aulacus rufilabris Giraud, 1868
- Aulacus transversostriatus Tournier, 1911
