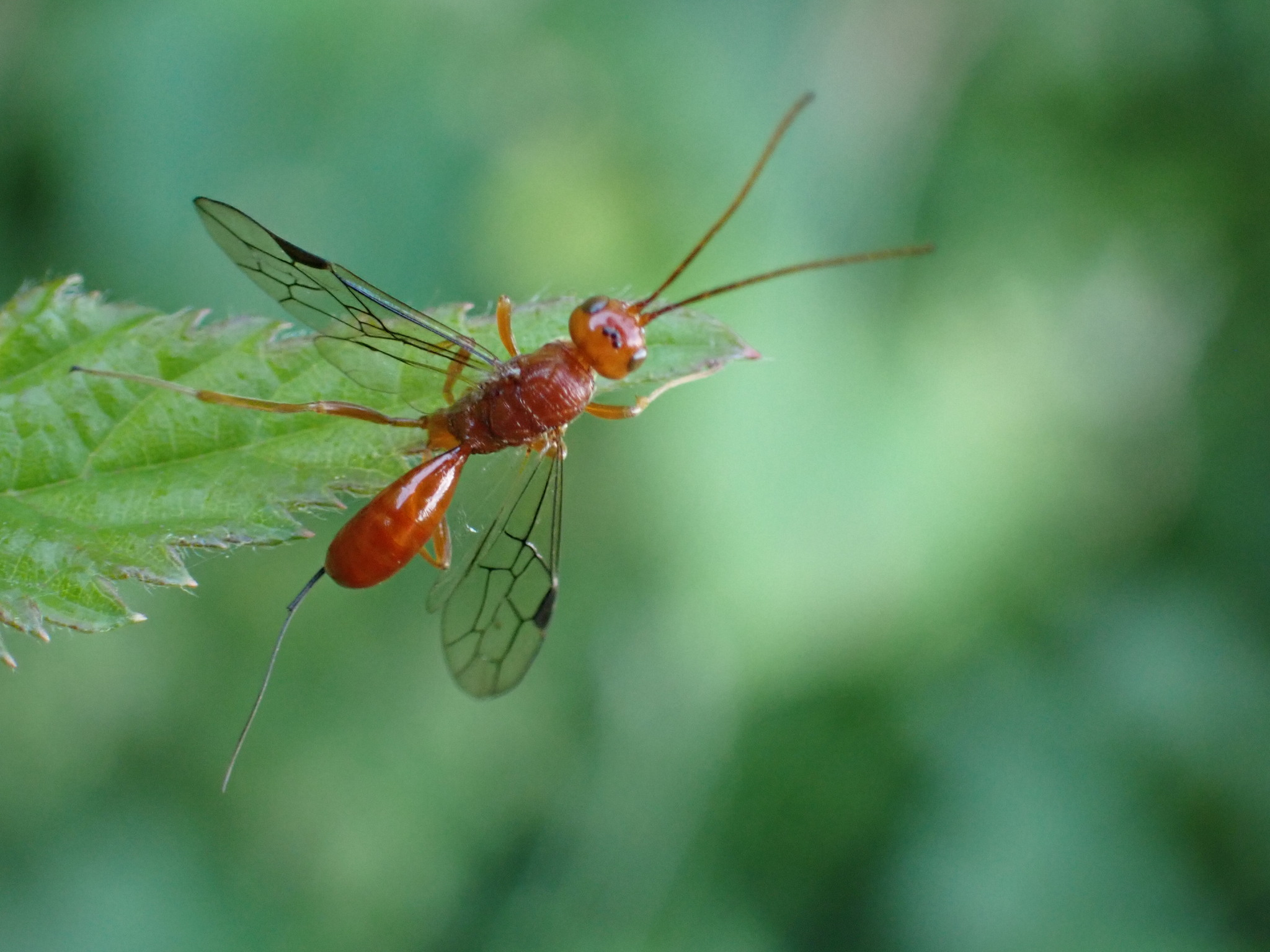
- Aulacus burquei female

Scientific classification
- Kingdom: Animalia
- Phylum: Arthropoda
- Clade: Pancrustacea
- Class: Insecta
- Order: Hymenoptera
- Family: Aulacidae
- Genus: Aulacus
- Species: A. burquei

Binomial name
- Aulacus burquei (Provancher, 1882)

= Aulacus burquei =

Species of wasp

Aulacus burquei is a species of parasitoid wasp in the family Aulacidae. It is found in North America. It's only known host is Xiphydria. A. burquei lays its egg within the eggs of its host.
