= Pristaulacus editus =

Scientific classification
- Kingdom: Animalia
- Phylum: Arthropoda
- Class: Insecta
- Order: Hymenoptera
- Family: Aulacidae
- Genus: Pristaulacus
- Species: P. editus

Binomial name
- Pristaulacus editus (Cresson, 1880)

Species of wasp

Pristaulacus editus is a species of wasp in the family Aulacidae. It is found in North America.
