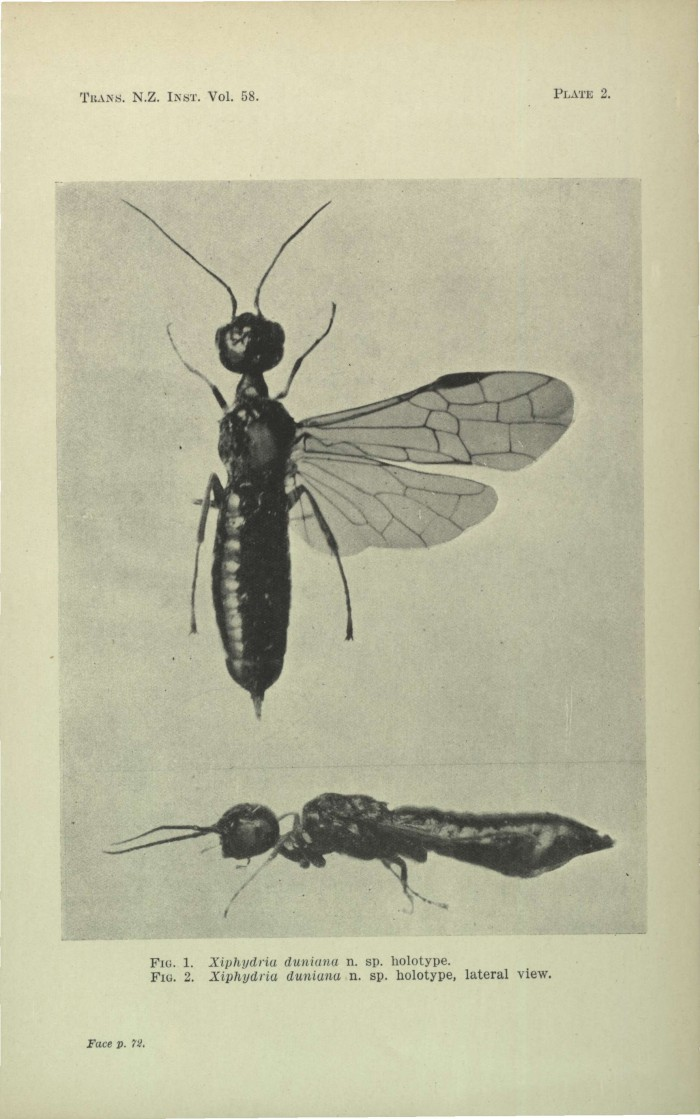
- X. duniana now known as M. duniana

Scientific classification
- Kingdom: Animalia
- Phylum: Arthropoda
- Class: Insecta
- Order: Hymenoptera
- Family: Xiphydriidae
- Genus: Moaxiphia
- Species: M. duniana

Binomial name
- Moaxiphia duniana (Gourlay, 1927)

Synonyms
- Xiphydria duniana Gourlay, 1927

= Moaxiphia duniana =

Species of Hymenoptera

Moaxiphia duniana is a species of wood wasp belonging to the genus Moaxiphia. This species was first described by Edward S. Gourlay in 1927 and originally named Xiphydria duniana. It is endemic to New Zealand.

== Description ==
The original description by Gourlay is as follows:

♀. 8 mm. Head shining, black, except mandibles which are castaneous, the teeth black, and palpi, brown, greatly suffused with black; clypeus, cheeks, scape, palpi and mandibles, covered sparsely with moderately long amber-coloured hairs, longest and thickest on the cheeks. Clypeus overlapping mandibles laterally, having a small sharp triangular tooth medially. Frons, between the antennae, conical, flattened above, and having a depression medially which ends at the anterior ocellus. Antennae 20-jointed, lying in a broad vertical furrow, widest at the insertion of the antennae, and narrowing just above them to continue as a shallow fossulet to the lateral ocelli. Thorax black dorsally, shining; brownish laterally and ventrally, more or less suffused with black, the base of the episternum black. Pronotum and episternum covered with long pale brown hairs, the lateral angles of the former yellow. Parapsidal grooves and a median longitudinal groove on the scutum deeply pitted, the former wide, the latter narrow. Scutellum flat, with steeply declivous sides. First abdominal spiracles large, prominent. Wings hyaline, highly iridescent, the nervures and stigma dark brown. Legs dark brown, suffused with black, the latter colour being present in greater proportion in the fore coxae, trochanters and femora. All the coxae slightly hairy; the hind tibiae and tarsi densely clothed with moderately long pale brown hair. Abdomen black dorsally, brown suffused with black ventrally, shining. Laterally, a cream spot on segments four, five and six, and a large oblique cream mark on segment nine. On each of sternites four to eight a row of pale brown hairs; segments nine and ten) have a patch laterally. Sheaths of ovipositor also hairy, dark brown suffused with black.
