= Pristaulacus rufitarsis =

Scientific classification
- Kingdom: Animalia
- Phylum: Arthropoda
- Class: Insecta
- Order: Hymenoptera
- Family: Aulacidae
- Genus: Pristaulacus
- Species: P. rufitarsis

Binomial name
- Pristaulacus rufitarsis (Cresson, 1864)

Synonyms
- Pristaulacus abdominalis (Cresson, 1880); Pristaulacus erythrogaster (Kieffer, 1904); Pristaulacus spinosipes (Kieffer, 1910)

Species of wasp

Pristaulacus rufitarsis is a species of wasp in the family Aulacidae, which is found in North America. This wasp is known for its parasitic behavior, particularly targeting the larvae of certain wood-boring beetles like the Hemlock borer (Phaenops fulvoguttata) and the poplar borer (Saperda calcarata).
