= Pristaulacus stigmaticus =

Scientific classification
- Kingdom: Animalia
- Phylum: Arthropoda
- Class: Insecta
- Order: Hymenoptera
- Family: Aulacidae
- Genus: Pristaulacus
- Species: P. stigmaticus

Binomial name
- Pristaulacus stigmaticus (Westwood, 1868)

Species of wasp

Pristaulacus stigmaticus is a species of wasp in the family Aulacidae. It is known only from Singapore.
