= Pristaulacus montanus =

Scientific classification
- Kingdom: Animalia
- Phylum: Arthropoda
- Class: Insecta
- Order: Hymenoptera
- Family: Aulacidae
- Genus: Pristaulacus
- Species: P. montanus

Binomial name
- Pristaulacus montanus (Cresson, 1879)

Synonyms
- Pristaulacus dentatus Bradley, 1908; Pristaulacus fuscalatus (Bradley, 1901)

Species of wasp

Pristaulacus montanus is a species of wasp in the family Aulacidae occurring in North America.
