= Pristaulacus strangaliae =

Scientific classification
- Kingdom: Animalia
- Phylum: Arthropoda
- Class: Insecta
- Order: Hymenoptera
- Family: Aulacidae
- Genus: Pristaulacus
- Species: P. strangaliae

Binomial name
- Pristaulacus strangaliae Rohwer, 1917

Synonyms
- Pristaulacus glabrescens Bradley, 1926; Pristaulacus taughanic Bradley, 1926

Species of wasp

Pristaulacus strangaliae is a species of wasp in the family Aulacidae and the order Hymenoptera found in North America. They are diurnal.
