= Pristaulacus occidentalis =

Scientific classification
- Kingdom: Animalia
- Phylum: Arthropoda
- Class: Insecta
- Order: Hymenoptera
- Family: Aulacidae
- Genus: Pristaulacus
- Species: P. occidentalis

Binomial name
- Pristaulacus occidentalis (Cresson, 1879)

Species of wasp

Pristaulacus occidentalis is a species of wasp in the family Aulacidae. It is found in North America.

== Subspecies ==
These two subspecies belong to the species Pristaulacus occidentalis:

- Pristaulacus occidentalis lavatus (Townes, 1950)
- Pristaulacus occidentalis occidentalis (Cresson, 1879)
