= Moaxiphia decepta =

Scientific classification
- Kingdom: Animalia
- Phylum: Arthropoda
- Class: Insecta
- Order: Hymenoptera
- Family: Xiphydriidae
- Genus: Moaxiphia
- Species: M. decepta

Binomial name
- Moaxiphia decepta (Smith, 1876)

Synonyms
- Derecyrta deceptus Smith, 1876; Xiphydria flavo-picta Smith, 1878

Species of hymenoptera

Moaxiphia decepta is a species of wood wasp belonging to the genus Moaxiphia. This species was first described by Frederick Smith in 1876 and originally named Derecyrta deceptus. It is endemic to New Zealand.
