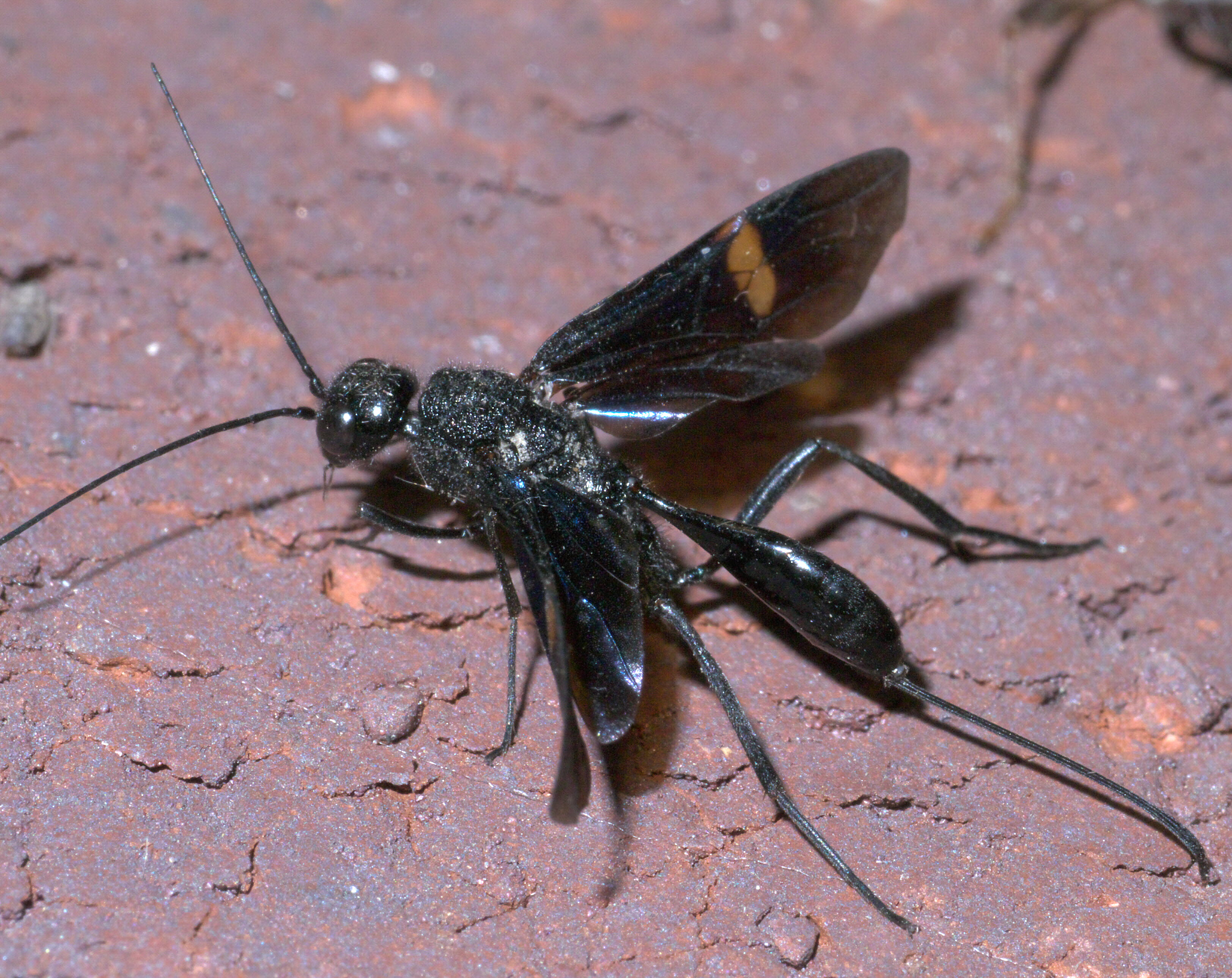

Scientific classification
- Kingdom: Animalia
- Phylum: Arthropoda
- Class: Insecta
- Order: Hymenoptera
- Family: Aulacidae
- Genus: Pristaulacus
- Species: P. fasciatus

Binomial name
- Pristaulacus fasciatus (Say, 1829)

= Pristaulacus fasciatus =

Species of wasp

Pristaulacus fasciatus is a species of wasp in the family Aulacidae. It is found in North America.

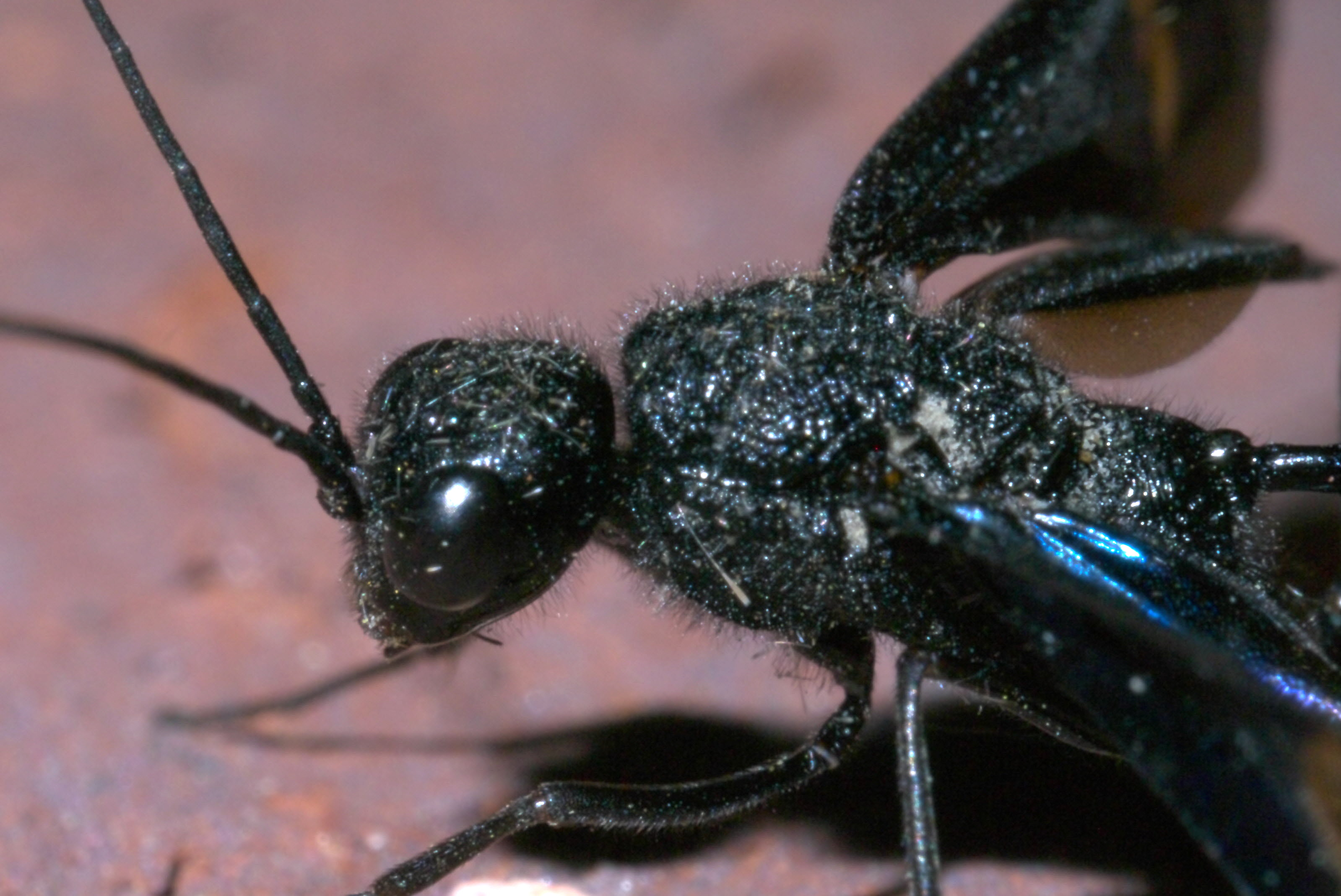
