= Moaxiphia gourlayi =

Scientific classification
- Kingdom: Animalia
- Phylum: Arthropoda
- Class: Insecta
- Order: Hymenoptera
- Family: Xiphydriidae
- Genus: Moaxiphia
- Species: M. gourlayi

Binomial name
- Moaxiphia gourlayi Ward & Goulet, 2011

Species of Hymenoptera

Moaxiphia gourlay is a species of wood wasp belonging to the genus Moaxiphia. This species was first described by Darren Ward and Henri Goulet in 2011. It is endemic to New Zealand.
