= Pristaulacus resutorivorus =

Scientific classification
- Kingdom: Animalia
- Phylum: Arthropoda
- Class: Insecta
- Order: Hymenoptera
- Family: Aulacidae
- Genus: Pristaulacus
- Species: P. resutorivorus

Binomial name
- Pristaulacus resutorivorus (Westwood, 1851)

Synonyms
- Pristaulacus firmus (Cresson, 1879); Pristaulacus subfirmus (Viereck, 1901)

Species of wasp

Pristaulacus resutorivorus is a species of wasp in the family Aulacidae. It is found in North America.
