= Pristaulacus niger =

Scientific classification
- Kingdom: Animalia
- Phylum: Arthropoda
- Class: Insecta
- Order: Hymenoptera
- Family: Aulacidae
- Genus: Pristaulacus
- Species: P. niger

Binomial name
- Pristaulacus niger (Shuckard, 1841)

Synonyms
- Pristaulacus abbottii (Westwood, 1841); Pristaulacus ater (Westwood, 1841); Pristaulacus aterrimus (Kieffer, 1911); Pristaulacus floridana (Rohwer, 1913); Pristaulacus hopkinsii Bradley, 1908

Species of wasp

Pristaulacus niger is a species of wasp in the family Aulacidae. It is found in North America.
