= Aulacus dispilis =

Scientific classification
- Kingdom: Animalia
- Phylum: Arthropoda
- Class: Insecta
- Order: Hymenoptera
- Family: Aulacidae
- Genus: Aulacus
- Species: A. dispilis

Binomial name
- Aulacus dispilis Townes, 1950

Species of wasp

Aulacus dispilis is a species of wasp in the family Aulacidae. It is found in North America.
