= Pristaulacus flavicrurus =

Scientific classification
- Kingdom: Animalia
- Phylum: Arthropoda
- Class: Insecta
- Order: Hymenoptera
- Family: Aulacidae
- Genus: Pristaulacus
- Species: P. flavicrurus

Binomial name
- Pristaulacus flavicrurus (Bradley, 1901)

Synonyms
- Pristaulacus flavipes Kieffer, 1904

Species of wasp

Pristaulacus flavicrurus is a species of wasp in the family Aulacidae. It is found in North America.
