= Alysson triangulifer =

Scientific classification
- Kingdom: Animalia
- Phylum: Arthropoda
- Clade: Pancrustacea
- Class: Insecta
- Order: Hymenoptera
- Family: Bembicidae
- Tribe: Alyssontini
- Genus: Alysson
- Species: A. triangulifer

Binomial name
- Alysson triangulifer Provancher, 1887

Species of wasp

Alysson triangulifer is a species of wasp in the family Bembicidae. It is found in North America.

== Subspecies ==
These two subspecies belong to the species Alysson triangulifer:

- Alysson triangulifer shawi Bradley, 1920
- Alysson triangulifer triangulifer Provancher, 1887
