= Austrocyrta =

Scientific classification
- Kingdom: Animalia
- Phylum: Arthropoda
- Clade: Pancrustacea
- Class: Insecta
- Order: Hymenoptera
- Family: Xiphydriidae
- Genus: Austrocyrta; Riek, 1955

Species
- Austrocyrta australiensis Austrocyrta fasciculata

Genus of insects

Austrocyrta is an endemic Australian genus of woodwasps.

== Taxonomy ==
The genus used to be monospecific as it was earlier thought to contain only Austrocyrta australiensis as its only species but later was revised by Jennings et al. 2009 and includes a second Species; Austrocyrta fasciculata

Austrocyrta contains the following species:

- Austrocyrta australiensis Riek, 1955
- Austrocyrta fasciculata Jennings & Austin, 2009
