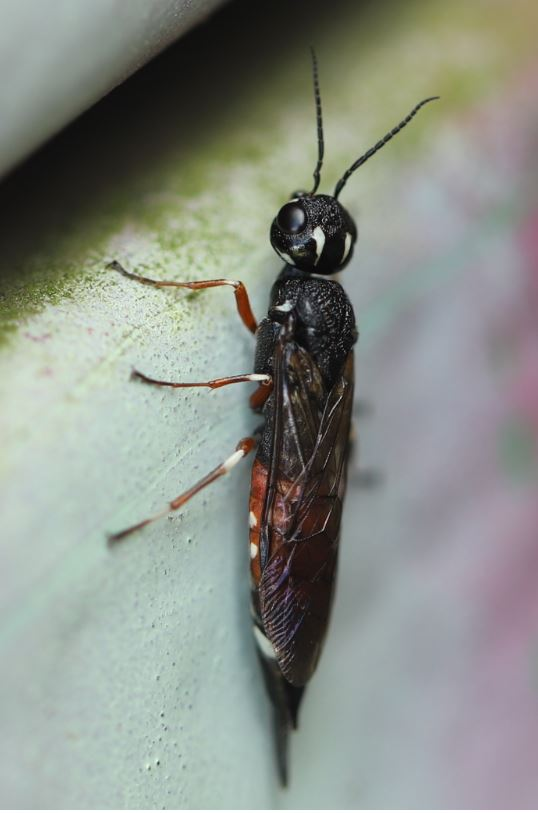
- Female

Scientific classification
- Kingdom: Animalia
- Phylum: Arthropoda
- Clade: Pancrustacea
- Class: Insecta
- Order: Hymenoptera
- Family: Xiphydriidae
- Genus: Xiphydria
- Species: X. prolongata

Binomial name
- Xiphydria prolongata (Geoffroy, 1785)

= Xiphydria prolongata =

Species of insect

Xiphydria prolongata, commonly known as willow wood wasp or red-belted necked wood wasp, is a species of sawfly in the family Xiphydriidae. It is native to Europe and has been introduced to North America.

== Description ==
Xiphydria prolongata is 6–18 mm long. It has a slim, cylindrical build and a rounded, highly mobile head on a long neck, traits shared with other Xiphydria. It can be distinguished from other species by the abdomen having a red band in the middle. The abdomen also has white spots laterally. Females have a rigid ovipositor.

== Biology ==
This species, similar to other xiphydriids, has wood-boring larvae. An adult female injects her eggs beneath bark at places where the bark is fissured and 2–3 mm thick. Larval boring in willow can cause reduced vigour, dieback and damaged heartwood.

When larvae are finished developing, they pupate and then emerge as adults. It is possible for over a hundred adults to emerge from a single trunk. Roughly 75% of emerging adults are male. Males emerge earlier than females do, emerging in May and June while the peak of female emergence is in July. Males are known to tap timber using the tips of their abdomens, creating sounds that can be heard from several metres away.

Recorded host genera include maple (Acer), alder (Alnus), birch (Betula), hornbeam (Carpinus), Platanus, Populus, oak (Quercus), willow (Salix) and elm (Ulmus).
