= Pristaulacus melleus =

Scientific classification
- Kingdom: Animalia
- Phylum: Arthropoda
- Class: Insecta
- Order: Hymenoptera
- Family: Aulacidae
- Genus: Pristaulacus
- Species: P. melleus

Binomial name
- Pristaulacus melleus (Cresson, 1879)

Synonyms
- Pristaulacus consors (Cresson, 1879); Pristaulacus ferrugineus (Kieffer, 1904)

Species of wasp

Pristaulacus melleus is a species of wasp in the family Aulacidae. It is found in North America.
