= Platypalpus holosericus =

Scientific classification
- Kingdom: Animalia
- Phylum: Arthropoda
- Class: Insecta
- Order: Diptera
- Family: Hybotidae
- Subfamily: Tachydromiinae
- Tribe: Tachydromiini
- Genus: Platypalpus
- Species: P. holosericus

Binomial name
- Platypalpus holosericus Melander, 1924

Species of fly

Platypalpus holosericus is a species of hybotid dance flies (insects in the family Hybotidae).

== Distribution ==
United States, Canada.
