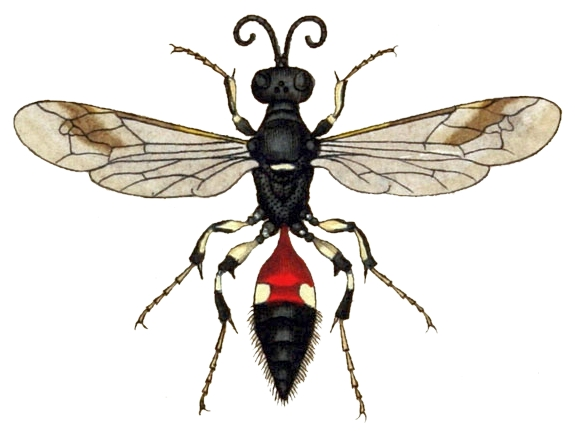
- Alysson spinosus

Scientific classification
- Domain: Eukaryota
- Kingdom: Animalia
- Phylum: Arthropoda
- Class: Insecta
- Order: Hymenoptera
- Family: Bembicidae
- Tribe: Alyssontini
- Genus: Alysson; Panzer, 1806

= Alysson (insect) =

Genus of insects

Alysson is a genus of hymenopterans in the family Bembicidae. There are at least 40 described species in Alysson.

== Species ==
These 42 species belong to the genus Alysson:

- Alysson annulipes Cameron, 1897^{i c g}
- Alysson attenuatus Wu and Zhou, 1987^{i c g}
- Alysson caeruleus Wu and Zhou, 1987^{i c g}
- Alysson cameroni Yasumatsu and Masuda, 1932^{i c g}
- Alysson carinatus Wu and Zhou, 1987^{i c g}
- Alysson conicus Provancher, 1889^{i c g}
- Alysson costai de Beaumont, 1953^{i c g}
- Alysson erythrothorax Cameron, 1902^{i c g}
- Alysson flavomaculatus Cameron, 1901^{i c g}
- Alysson guichardi Arnold, 1951^{i c g}
- Alysson guignardi Provancher, 1887^{i c g b}
- Alysson guillarmodi Arnold, 1944^{i c g}
- Alysson harbinensis Tsuneki, 1967^{c g}
- Alysson japonicus Tsuneki, 1977^{i c g}
- Alysson jaroslavensis (Kokujev, 1906)^{c g}
- Alysson katkovi Kokujev, 1906^{c g}
- Alysson madecassus Arnold, 1945^{i c g}
- Alysson maracandensis Radoszkowski, 1877^{i c g}
- Alysson melleus Say, 1837^{i c g b}
- Alysson monticola Tsuneki, 1977^{i c g}
- Alysson nigrilabius Wu and Zhou, 1987^{i c g}
- Alysson ocellatus de Beaumont, 1967^{i c g}
- Alysson oppositus Say, 1837^{i c g b}
- Alysson pertheesi Gorski, 1852^{i c g}
- Alysson picteti Handlirsch, 1895^{i c g}
- Alysson radiatus W. Fox, 1894^{i c g}
- Alysson ratzeburgi Dahlbom, 1843^{i c g}
- Alysson ruficollis Cameron, 1898^{i c g}
- Alysson seyrigi Arnold, 1945^{i c g}
- Alysson sichuanensis Wu and Zhou, 1987^{i c g}
- Alysson spinosus (Panzer, 1801)^{i c g}
- Alysson striatus W. Fox, 1894^{i c g}
- Alysson taiwanus Sonan, 1940^{i c g}
- Alysson takasago Tsuneki, 1977^{i c g}
- Alysson testaceitarsis Cameron, 1902^{i c g}
- Alysson tomentosus McLeay, 1828^{i c g}
- Alysson triangularis Krombein, 1985^{i c g}
- Alysson triangulifer Provancher, 1887^{i c g b}
- Alysson tricolor Lepeletier and Audinet-Serville, 1825^{i c g}
- Alysson tridentatus Wu and Zhou, 1987^{i c g}
- Alysson verhoeffi Tsuneki, 1967^{i c g}
- Alysson yunnanensis Wu and Zhou, 1987^{i c g}

Data sources: i = ITIS, c = Catalogue of Life, g = GBIF, b = Bugguide.net
