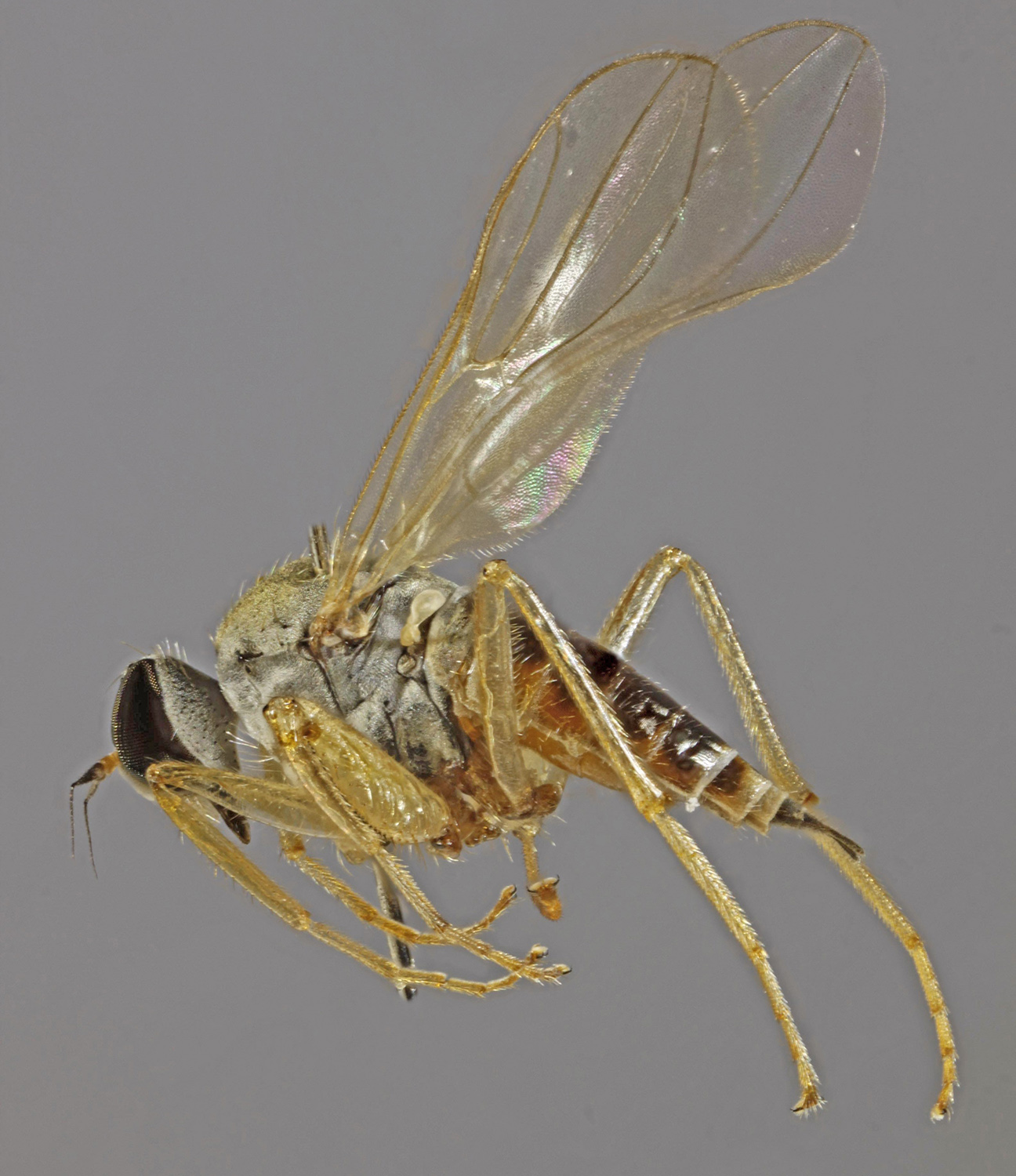
- Platypalpus candicans North Wales

Scientific classification
- Kingdom: Animalia
- Phylum: Arthropoda
- Clade: Pancrustacea
- Class: Insecta
- Order: Diptera
- Family: Hybotidae
- Subfamily: Tachydromiinae
- Tribe: Tachydromiini
- Genus: Platypalpus
- Species: P. candicans

Binomial name
- Platypalpus candicans (Fallén, 1815)

Synonyms
- Tachydromia candicans Fallén, 1815; Tachydromia ventralis Meigen, 1822; Platypalpus varius Walker, 1852; Tachydromia oedicnema Strobl, 1898

= Platypalpus candicans =

Species of fly

Platypalpus candicans is a species of fly in the family Hybotidae. It is found in the Palearctic.
