= Alysson guignardi =

Scientific classification
- Kingdom: Animalia
- Phylum: Arthropoda
- Clade: Pancrustacea
- Class: Insecta
- Order: Hymenoptera
- Family: Bembicidae
- Tribe: Alyssontini
- Genus: Alysson
- Species: A. guignardi

Binomial name
- Alysson guignardi Provancher, 1887

Synonyms
- Alyson interstitialis Cameron, 1902; Alyson petiolatus Cameron, 1902

Species of wasp

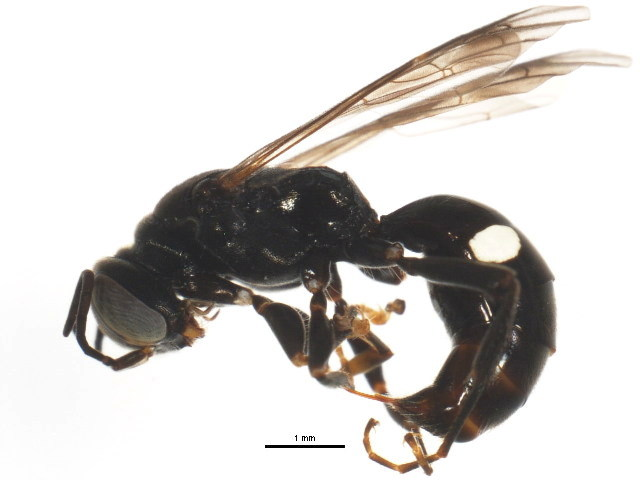

Alysson guignardi is a species of wasp in the family Bembicidae. It is found in North America.
