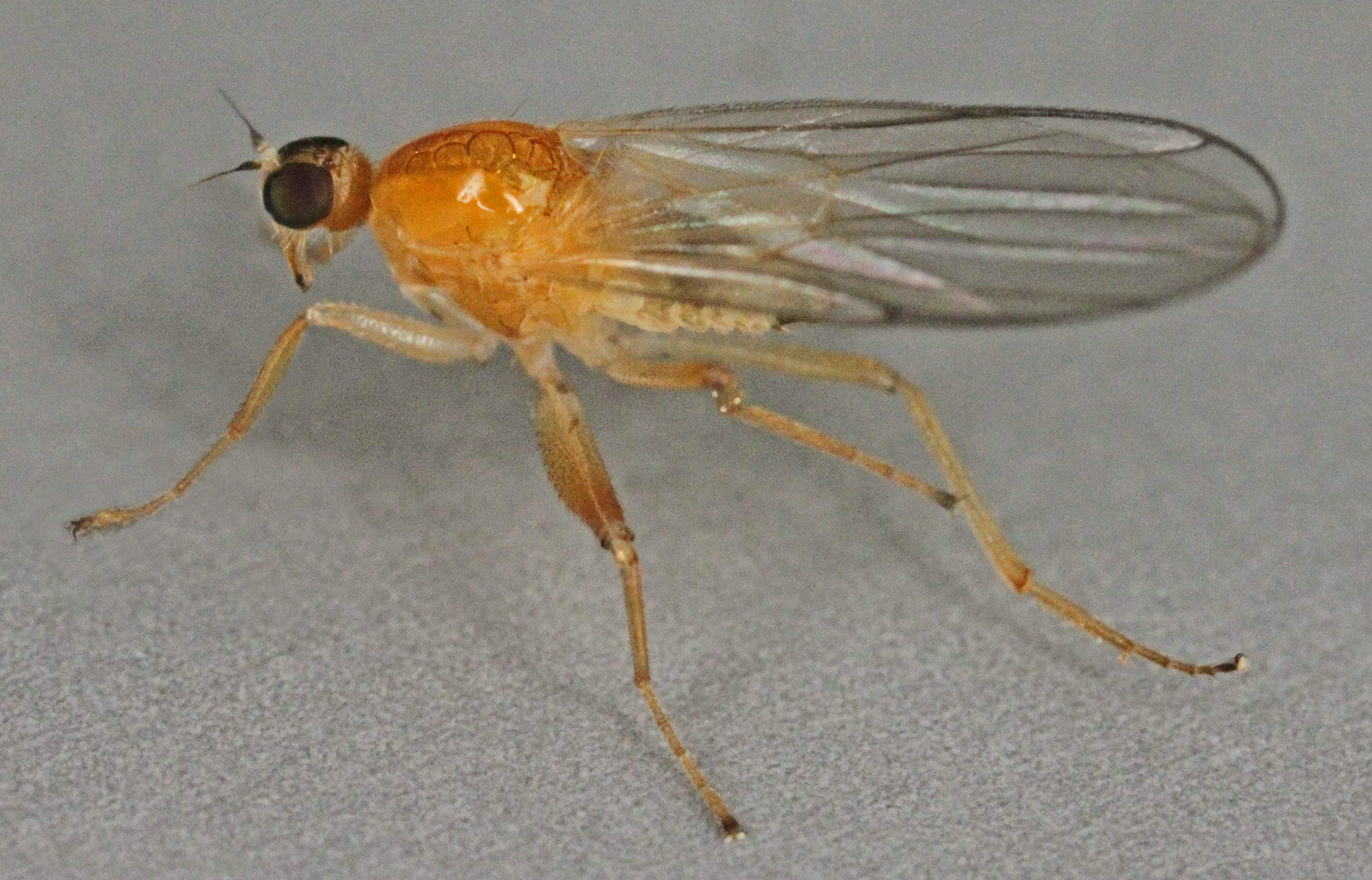
- Platypalpus luteus North Wales

Scientific classification
- Kingdom: Animalia
- Phylum: Arthropoda
- Class: Insecta
- Order: Diptera
- Family: Hybotidae
- Subfamily: Tachydromiinae
- Tribe: Tachydromiini
- Genus: Platypalpus
- Species: P. luteus

Binomial name
- Platypalpus luteus (Meigen, 1804)

Synonyms
- Tachydromia lutea Meigen, 1804; Tachydromia glabra Meigen, 1822; Tachydromia pallidus Meigen, 1822; Platypalpus formalis Walker, 1852

= Platypalpus luteus =

Species of fly

Platypalpus luteus is a species of fly in the family Hybotidae. It is found in the Palearctic.
