= Platypalpus tersus =

Scientific classification
- Kingdom: Animalia
- Phylum: Arthropoda
- Class: Insecta
- Order: Diptera
- Family: Hybotidae
- Subfamily: Tachydromiinae
- Tribe: Tachydromiini
- Genus: Platypalpus
- Species: P. tersus

Binomial name
- Platypalpus tersus Coquillett, 1895

Species of fly

Platypalpus tersus is a species of hybotid dance flies (insects in the family Hybotidae).

== Distribution ==
United States.
