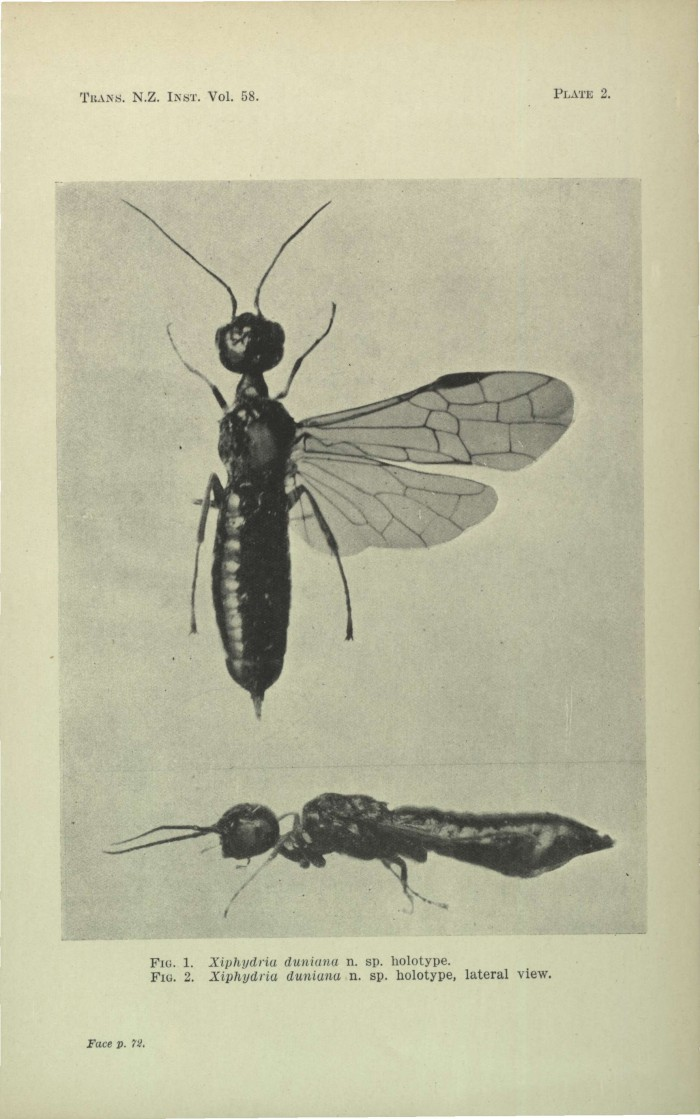
- Moaxiphia duniana

Scientific classification
- Kingdom: Animalia
- Phylum: Arthropoda
- Class: Insecta
- Order: Hymenoptera
- Family: Xiphydriidae
- Genus: Moaxiphia; Maa, 1949

= Moaxiphia =

Genus of wood wasps

Moaxiphia is a genus of wood wasps belonging to the family Xiphydriidae. This genus was originally described by Tsing-chao Maa in 1949. The type species of this genus is Derecyrta decepta Smith, 1876 by original designation. All species placed within this genus are endemic to New Zealand.

== Species ==
The following species are recognised in the genus Moaxiphia:

- Moaxiphia decepta (Smith, 1876)
- Moaxiphia duniana (Gourlay, 1927)
- Moaxiphia gourlayi Ward & Goulet, 2011
