= Platypalpus mesogrammus =

Scientific classification
- Domain: Eukaryota
- Kingdom: Animalia
- Phylum: Arthropoda
- Class: Insecta
- Order: Diptera
- Family: Hybotidae
- Tribe: Tachydromiini
- Genus: Platypalpus
- Species: P. mesogrammus

Binomial name
- Platypalpus mesogrammus Loew, 1863

Species of fly

Platypalpus mesogrammus is a species of hybotid dance flies (insects in the family Hybotidae).
