= Platypalpus impexus =

Scientific classification
- Kingdom: Animalia
- Phylum: Arthropoda
- Class: Insecta
- Order: Diptera
- Family: Hybotidae
- Subfamily: Tachydromiinae
- Tribe: Tachydromiini
- Genus: Platypalpus
- Species: P. impexus

Binomial name
- Platypalpus impexus Melander, 1902

Species of fly

Platypalpus impexus is a species of hybotid dance fly in the family Hybotidae.

== Distribution ==
United States.
