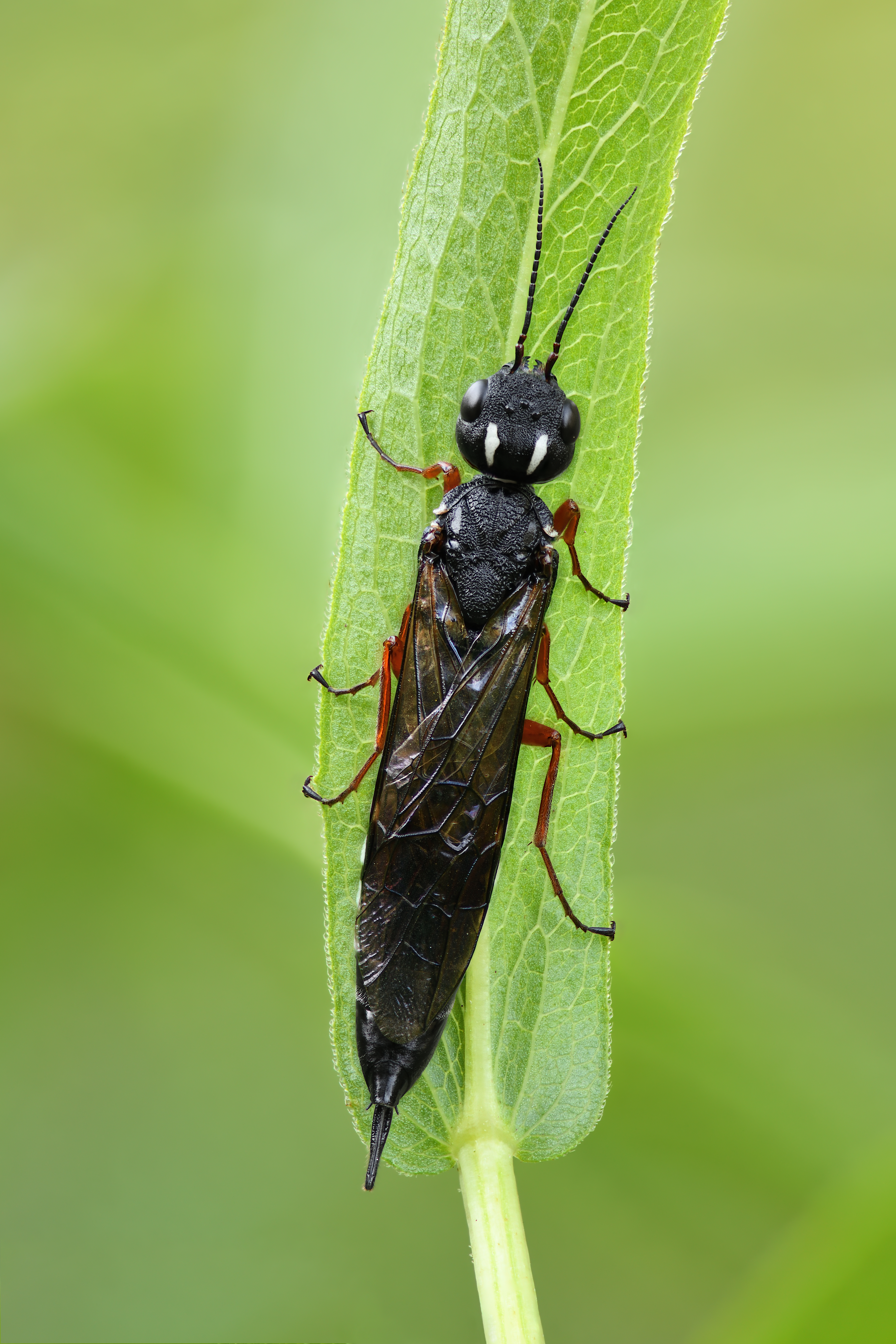
- Xiphydria camelus, female

Scientific classification
- Kingdom: Animalia
- Phylum: Arthropoda
- Clade: Pancrustacea
- Class: Insecta
- Order: Hymenoptera
- Family: Xiphydriidae
- Genus: Xiphydria; Latreille, 1802

Synonyms
- Hybonotus Klug, 1803; Xiphiura Fallén, 1813; Xiphidria Lamarck, 1817; Hyponotus Billberg, 1820; Xyphidria Lepeletier, 1823; Konowia Brauns, 1884; Pseudoxiphydria Enslin, 1911

= Xiphydria =

Genus of wood wasps

Xiphydria is a genus of wood wasps belonging to the family Xiphydriidae.

This genus is Holarctic, being found in Europe, Asia and North America.

== Description ==
In Xiphydria, the head has mandibles each with four teeth, 5-segmented maxillary palps, a clypeus with a medial tooth-like projection and antennae with about 20 segments. The pronotum is strongly constricted in dorsal view and the propleuron is long in lateral view (this means the head is positioned on a relatively long "neck"). The hind wing has only two closed cells.

Larvae are white and grub-like. They resemble larvae of Siricidae, another wood-boring group of sawflies.

== Biology ==
Female Xiphydria oviposit into diseased or dead wood, often branches that have fallen or are about to fall (widowmakers). During oviposition, they also infect the wood with a symbiotic fungus that starts decomposing the wood. Eggs hatch into larvae that bore galleries into wood parallel to the grain. As larvae feed, they pack frass (waste) behind their bodies. At maturity, larvae become prepupae which switch direction so the gallery runs towards the outside of the branch (this is to reduce the amount of wood that needs to be chewed through later). The next step is pupation. Once that is complete, adult wasps emerge, leaving behind emergence holes ~3 mm wide in the wood. This genus is univoltine, meaning there is one generation per year.

They attack a range of different broadleaf trees: Acer (maple), Betula (birch), Ulmus (elm), Carya (hickory), Populus (cottonwood), Salix (willow), Alnus (alder), Platanus (sycamore, plane), Rhus (sumac), Fagus (beech), Fraxinus (ash), Tilia (basswood), Ostrya (hophornbeam), Crataegus (hawthorn), Carpinus (hornbeam), Prunus (cherry, plum), and Quercus (oak).

== Importance to humans ==
Xiphydriidae may occur in firewood or raw woodworking materials. While usually of little economic importance, X. longicallis can cause economic damage to oak wood.

== Species ==
The following species are recognised in the genus Xiphydria:

- Xiphydria albopicta Shinohara & Kameda, 2019
- Xiphydria annulitibia Takeuchi, 1936
- Xiphydria betulae (Enslin, 1911)
- Xiphydria camelus (Linnaeus, 1758)
- Xiphydria canadensis (Provancher, 1875)
- Xiphydria duniana Gourlay, 1927
- Xiphydria irrorata F.Pesarini, 1995
- Xiphydria kanba Shinohara, Hara & Smith, 2020
- Xiphydria kastsheevi Ermolenko, 1979
- Xiphydria konishii Shinohara, Hara & Smith, 2020
- Xiphydria laeviceps Smith, 1860
- Xiphydria longicollis (Geoffroy, 1785)
- Xiphydria megapolitana (Brauns, 1884)
- Xiphydria melanoptera Shinohara, Hara & Smith, 2020
- Xiphydria mellipes Harris 1841
- Xiphydria nagasei Shinohara, 2019
- Xiphydria ogasawarai Matsumura, 1927
- Xiphydria palaeanarctica Shinohara, 2019
- Xiphydria picta Konow, 1897
- Xiphydria prolongata (Geoffroy, 1785)
- Xiphydria scutellata Konow, 1897
- BOLD:AAG7648 (Xiphydria sp.)
- BOLD:ACW8274 (Xiphydria sp.)
- BOLD:ADX5042 (Xiphydria sp.)
- BOLD:AED1517 (Xiphydria sp.)

== Gallery ==
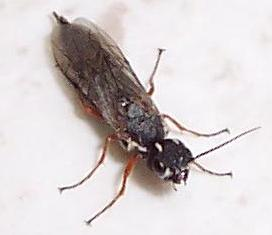
Xiphydria mellipes

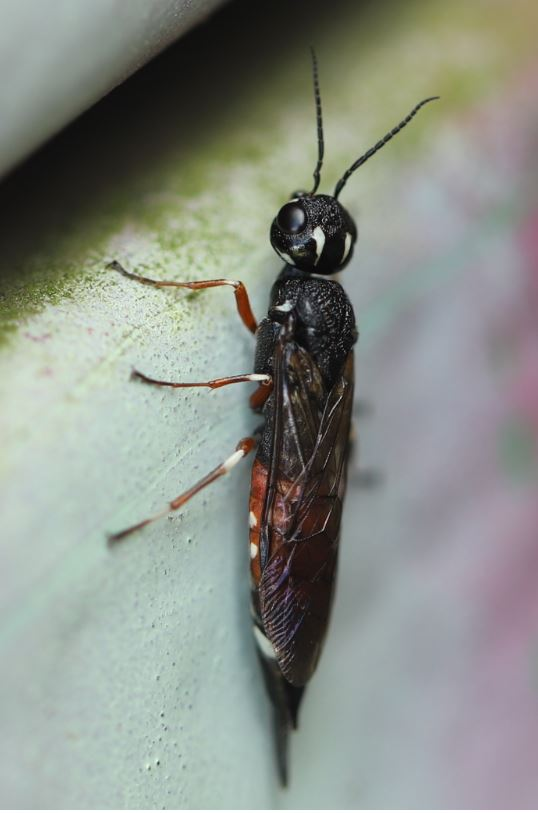
Xiphydria prolongata
