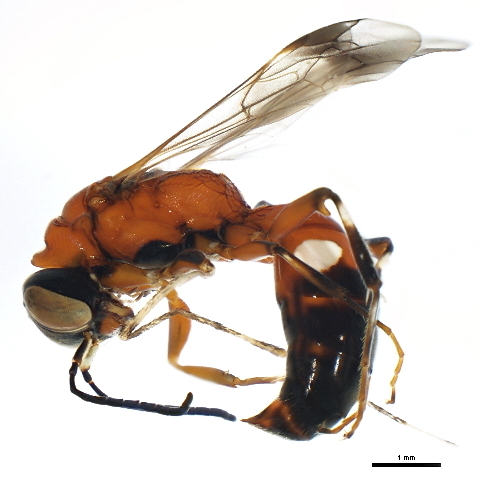
- Alison melleus

Scientific classification
- Domain: Eukaryota
- Kingdom: Animalia
- Phylum: Arthropoda
- Class: Insecta
- Order: Hymenoptera
- Family: Bembicidae
- Genus: Alysson
- Species: A. melleus

Binomial name
- Alysson melleus Say, 1837

= Alysson melleus =

Species of wasp

Alysson melleus is a species of wasp in the family Bembicidae. It is found in North America.
