= Gymnopilus melleus =

Scientific classification
- Kingdom: Fungi
- Division: Basidiomycota
- Class: Agaricomycetes
- Order: Agaricales
- Family: Hymenogastraceae
- Genus: Gymnopilus
- Species: G. melleus

Binomial name
- Gymnopilus melleus Hesler (1969)

Species of fungus

Gymnopilus melleus Mycological characteristics
- Gills on hymenium
- Cap is convex
- Hymenium is adnexed or adnate
- Ecology is saprotrophic

Gymnopilus melleus is a species of mushroom-forming fungus in the family Hymenogastraceae.

== Description ==
The cap is 2 to 3.5 centimetres (0.8 to 1.4 in) in diameter.

== Habitat and distribution ==
Gymnopilus melleus has been found growing in clusters on pine stumps in Alabama, fruiting in December.

== See also ==
- List of Gymnopilus species
