= Platypalpus melleus =

Scientific classification
- Kingdom: Animalia
- Phylum: Arthropoda
- Class: Insecta
- Order: Diptera
- Family: Hybotidae
- Subfamily: Tachydromiinae
- Tribe: Tachydromiini
- Genus: Platypalpus
- Species: P. melleus

Binomial name
- Platypalpus melleus Melander, 1928

Species of fly

Platypalpus melleus is a species of hybotid dance flies (insects in the family Hybotidae).

== Distribution ==
United States.
