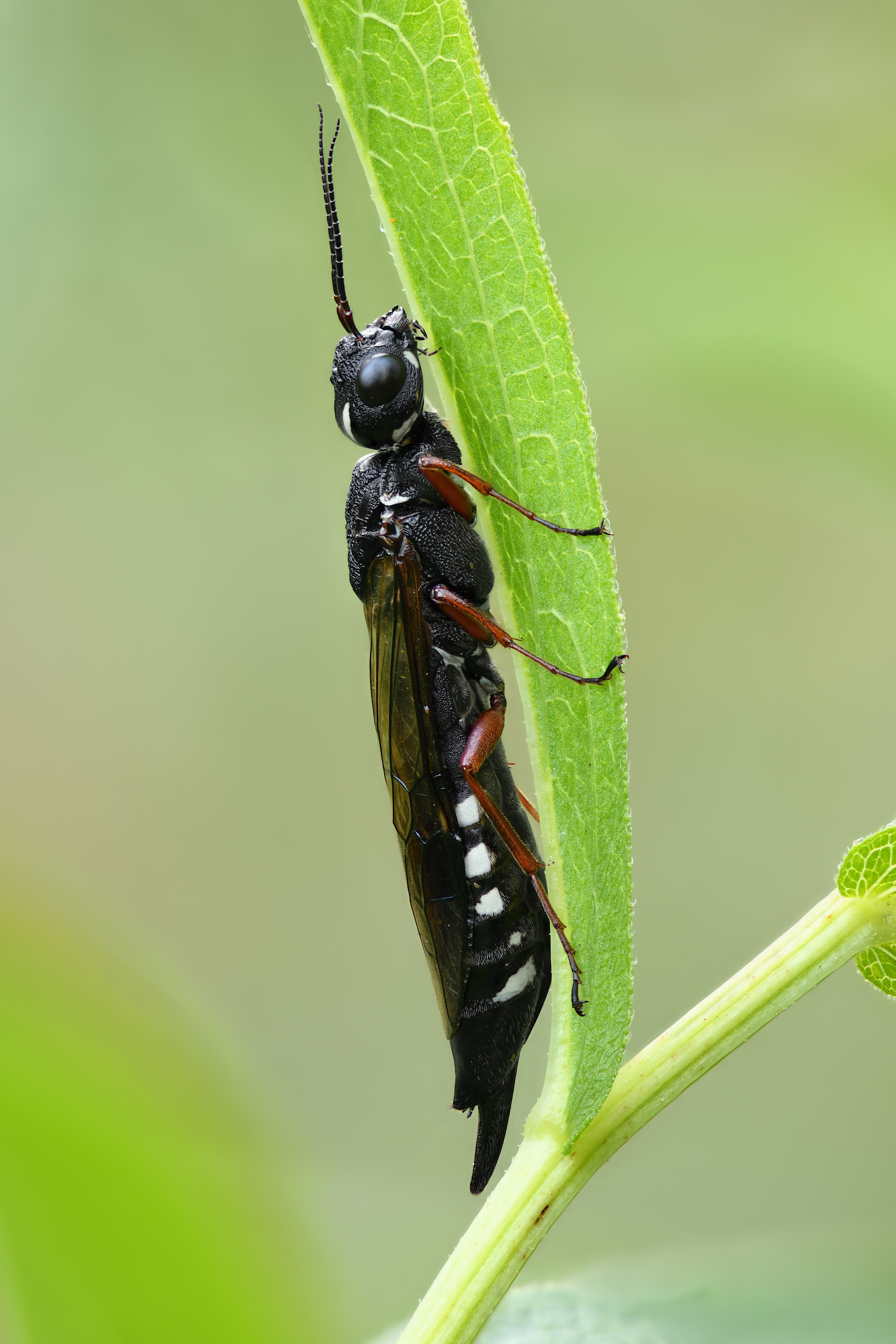
- Xiphydria camelus (Xiphydria)
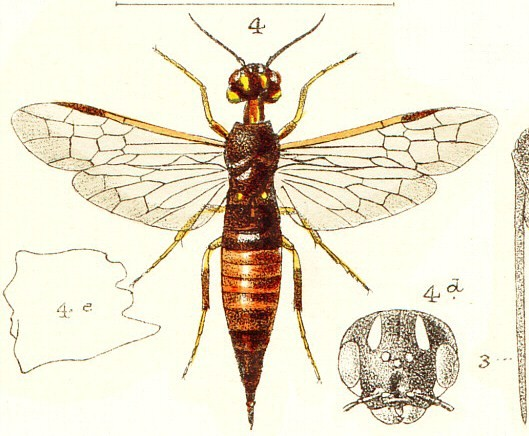
- Xiphydria type genus of the family Xiphydriidae (Xiphydria prolongata)

Scientific classification
- Kingdom: Animalia
- Phylum: Arthropoda
- Clade: Pancrustacea
- Class: Insecta
- Order: Hymenoptera
- Superfamily: Xiphydrioidea
- Family: Xiphydriidae; Leach, 1815

Type genus
- Xiphydria

= Xiphydriidae =

Xiphydriidae Temporal range: Cenomanian–Recent

Family of sawflies

Xiphydriidae are a family of wood wasps that includes around 150 species. They are located all over the world including North and South America, Australia, Europe, and others. Xiphydriidae larvae are wood borers in dead trees or branches of a range of trees. They are characterized as having long and skinny necks with dome-shaped heads. The oldest fossils of the group are from the mid Cretaceous.

== Genera ==
These 29 genera belong to the family Xiphydriidae:

- Alloxiphia Wei, 2002
- Austrocyrta Riek, 1955
- Austroxiphyda Jennings, Macdonald, Schiff & Parslow, 2021
- Brachyxiphus Philippi, 1871
- Calexiphyda Smith, 2008
- Carinoxiphia Wei, 1999
- Derecyrta Smith, 1860
- Eoxiphia Maa, 1949
- Euxiphydria Semenov-Tian-Shanskii & Gussakovskii, 1935
- Genaxiphia Maa, 1949
- Gryponeura Benson, 1954
- Heteroxiphia Saini & Singh, 1987
- Hyperxiphia Maa, 1949
- Indoxiphia Maa, 1949
- Lataxiphyda Smith, 2008
- Lissoxiphyda Smith, 2008
- Megaxiphia Wei, 1999
- Moaxiphia Maa, 1949
- Obesaxiphyda Smith, 2008
- Platyxiphydria Takeuchi, 1938
- Rhysacephala Benson, 1954
- Steirocephala Benson, 1954
- Trixiphidia Wei, 1999
- Xiphidiaphora Benson, 1954
- Xiphydria Latreille, 1802
- Xiphydriola Semenov-Tian-Shanskii, 1921
- Yangixiphia Wei, 2002
- † Paraxiphydria Gao et al., 2022 Burmese amber, Myanmar Cretaceous Albian-Cenomanian

== Anatomy and morphology ==
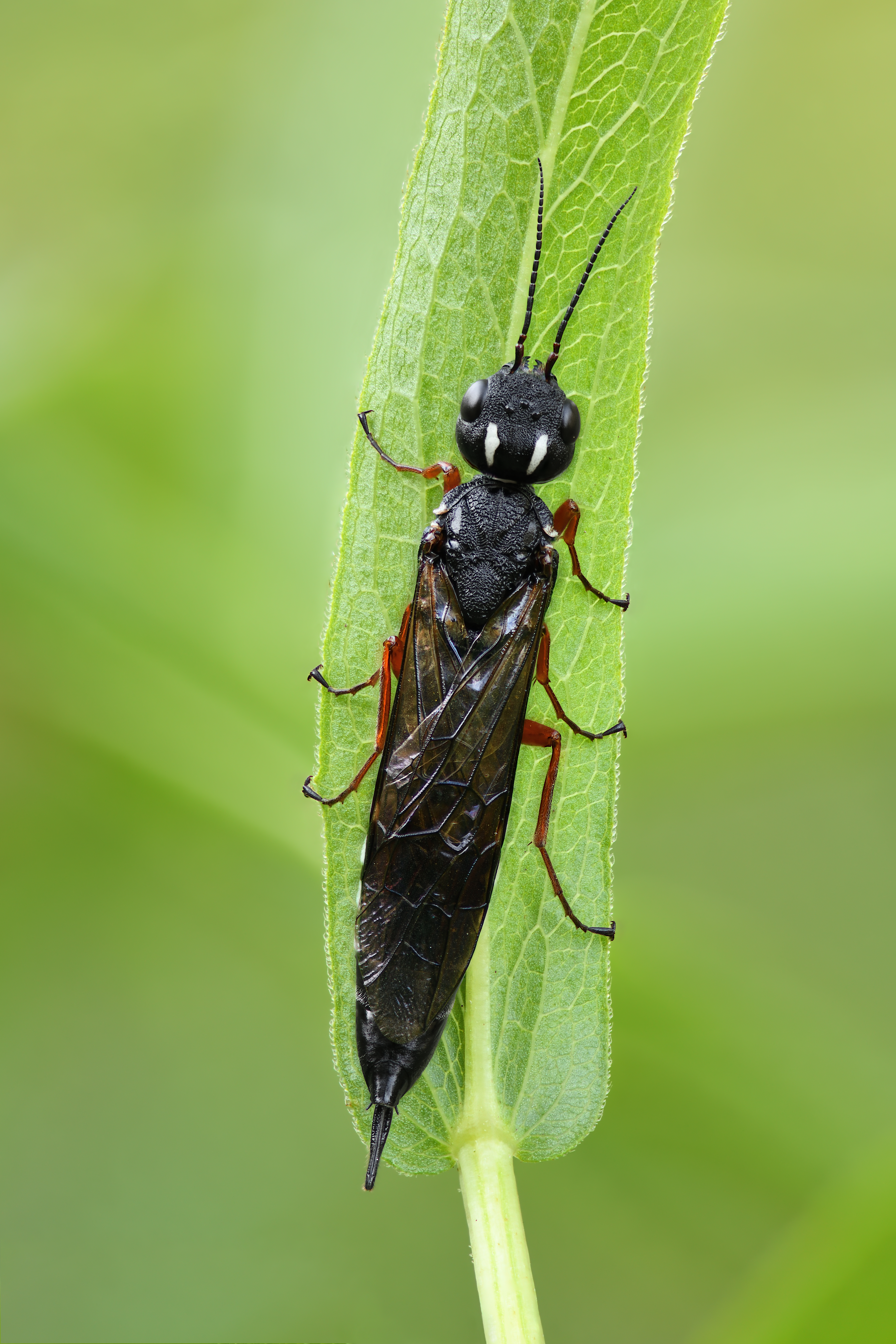
Xiphydria camelus

=== Head ===
Most of the species of Xiphydriidae have antennae that are filiform. The antennal segments vary in number ranging from 14 to 22. The maxillary and labial palpi shape and length varies by species. They have an occipital carina which is a ridge in the back of the head. The head is somewhat spherical and is shiny.

=== Thorax ===
The pronotum is medially constricted in Xiphydriidae. The defined axillae completely separates the scutum laterally from the mesoscutellum. Parts of the thorax for Xiphydriidae are generally smooth and shiny.

=== Abdomen ===
The segment of the abdomen called the gaster can have an orange, red, or yellow coloring pattern.

A study by David R. Smith broke the Xiphydriidae into different groups by their abdomen. The groups were as follows:

- Xiphydriidae that have a maxillary palpus segmented into 7.
- Xiphydriidae that have short maxillary palpi and contain female fore claws with inner tooth.
- Xiphydriidae that have short maxillary palpi and also contain claws of both sexes with inner tooth.

== Life cycle and development ==
=== Larva ===
The Xiphydriidae larvae phytophagous, meaning bore into dead or weak trees and plants. When they are buried in these trees, they rely on symbiotic fungi for food in the tunnels that they made. The larva either do not have legs or they have vestigial legs. During the larval stage, the head of Xiphydriidae is as long as broad. As a larva, the antenna contains either three or four segments. The first segment of the antenna does not have setae and is not enlarged.

=== Adult ===
Adults are 6-21mm long. Adult Xiphydriidae are most commonly found in shadowy places and run on the surface of leaves. The adults have heads that are spherical which are attached to long and skinny necks.

== Ecology ==
Xiphydriidae bore and feed into dying or weakened trees so they do not have a negative effect to the environment. They can be a secondary pest to humans because of the dead wood people may bring into their homes. Xiphydriidae can be a host for parasitoid Aulacidae and they emerge from larvae that are fully grown.

In Japan, female Xiphydriidae were dissected and fungal spores were found. The spores were 5 to 30 micrometers in diameter and had a globular shape. Mucus was also in the glandular organs of some of the wood wasps.
