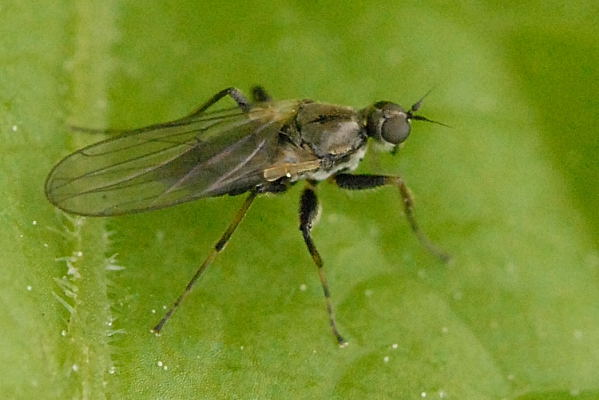
- Platypalpus notatus

Scientific classification
- Kingdom: Animalia
- Phylum: Arthropoda
- Class: Insecta
- Order: Diptera
- Family: Hybotidae
- Subfamily: Tachydromiinae
- Tribe: Tachydromiini
- Genus: Platypalpus; Macquart, 1827

Type species
- Musca cursitans Fabricius, 1775

Synonyms
- Brevios Brunetti, 1913; Cleptodromia Corti, 1907; Howlettia Brunetti, 1913; Phoroxypha Rondani, 1856

= Platypalpus =

Genus of insects

P. pectoralis in copula

Platypalpus is a genus of hybotid flies. It is worldwide in distribution, but best represented in Europe, with over 200 species. There are at least 580 described species in Platypalpus worldwide.

== See also ==
- List of Platypalpus species
