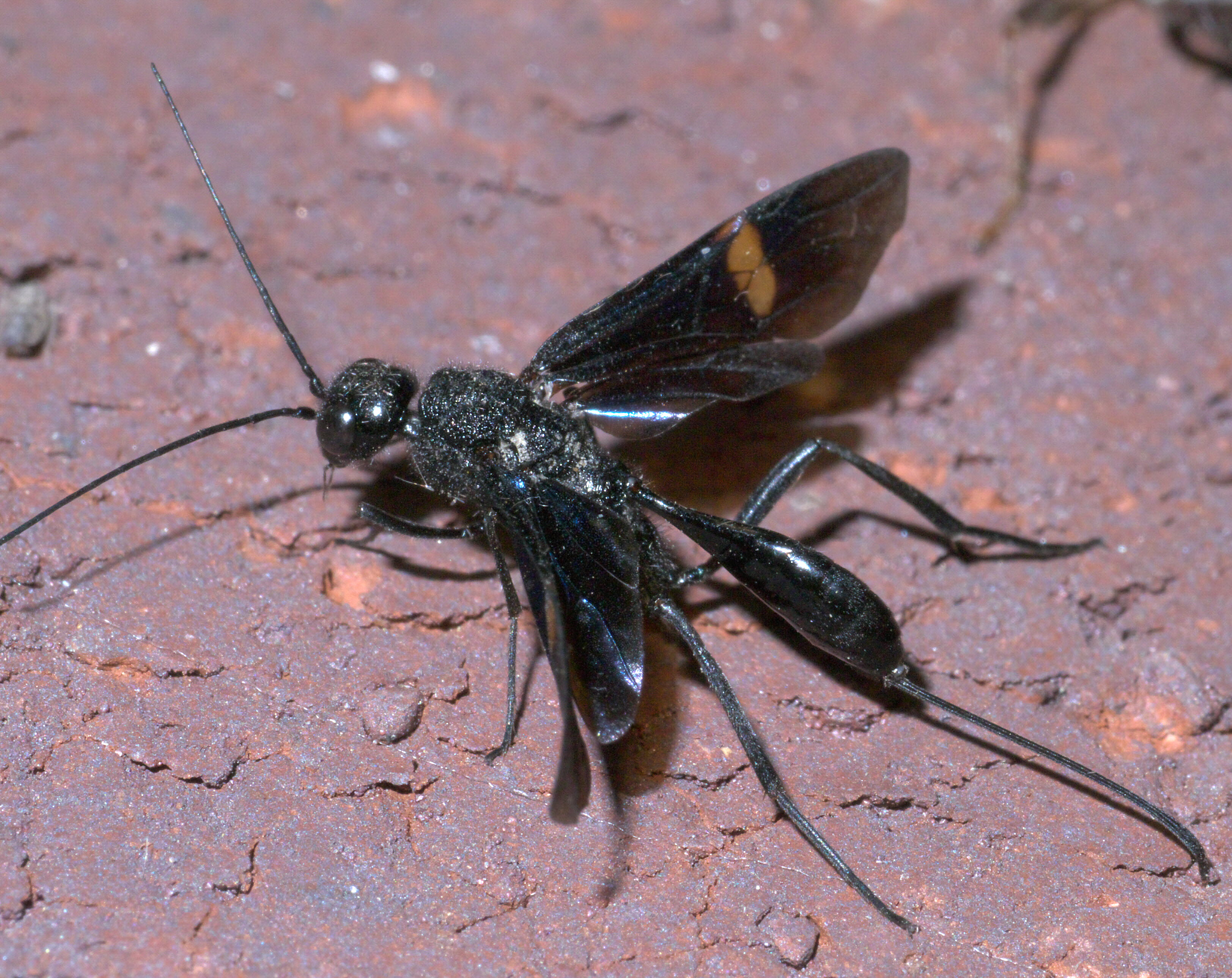
- Pristaulacus fasciatus

Scientific classification
- Kingdom: Animalia
- Phylum: Arthropoda
- Clade: Pancrustacea
- Class: Insecta
- Order: Hymenoptera
- Family: Aulacidae
- Genus: Pristaulacus; Kieffer, 1900

Diversity
- at least 190 species

Synonyms
- Anaulacus Semenow, 1903; Aulacites Cockerell, 1916; Aulacomastus Muesebeck & Walkley, 1956; Deraiodontus Bradley, 1901; Interaulacus Bradley, 1908; Odontaulacus Kieffer, 1903; Oleisoprister Bradley, 1901; Pristaulacus (Neaulacus) Bradley, 1908; Psilaulacus Kieffer, 1910; Semenovius Bradley, 1908; Semenowia Kieffer, 1903; Tetraulacinus Kieffer, 1910; Tropaulacus Bradley, 1908

= Pristaulacus =

Genus of wasps

Pristaulacus is a cosmopolitan genus of aulacid wasps in the Hymenopteran family, Aulacidae. There are more than 190 described species in Pristaulacus. Most host records for Pristaulacus are wood-boring beetles (Cerambycidae and Buprestidae).

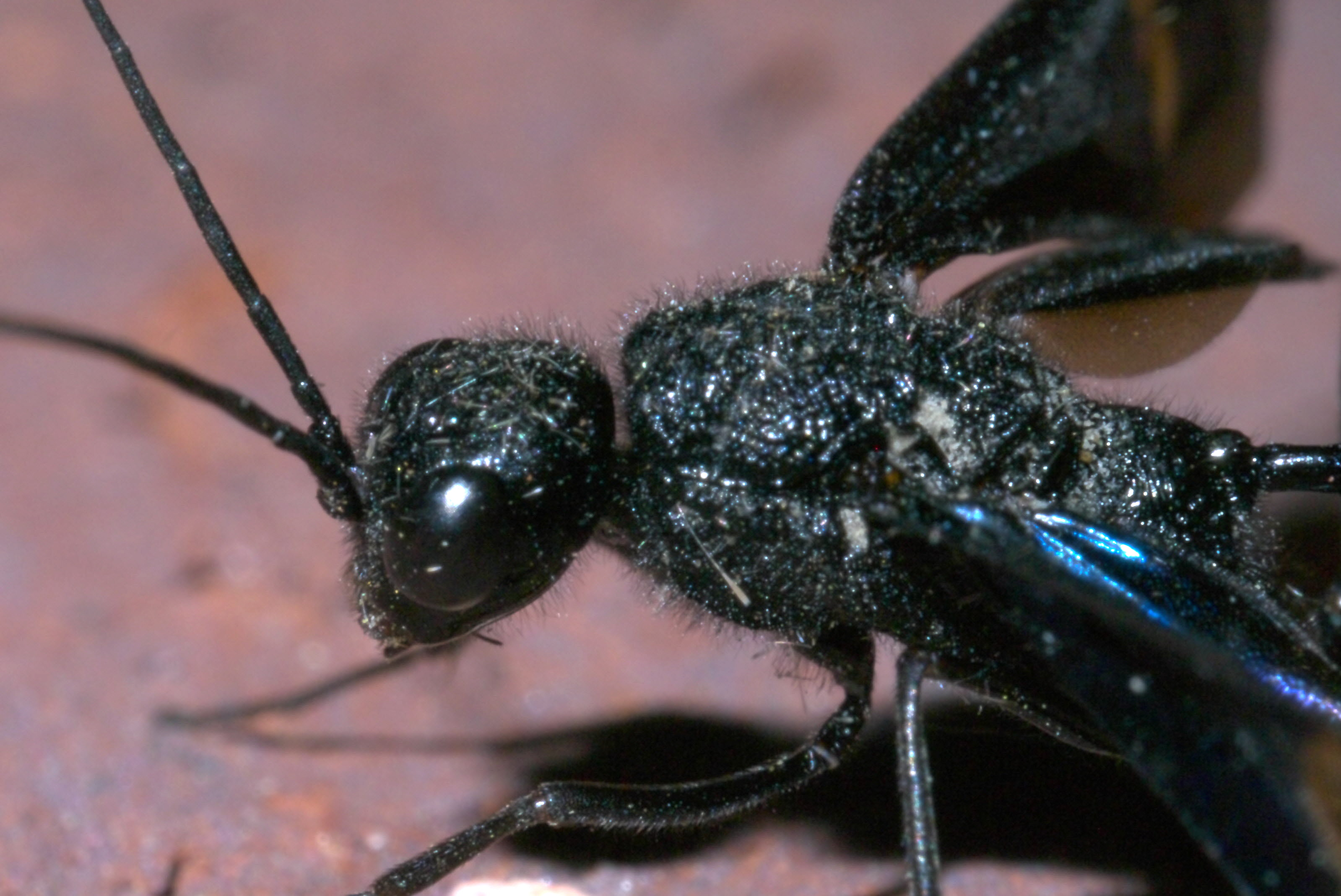
Pristaulacus fasciatus

== See also ==
- List of Pristaulacus species
