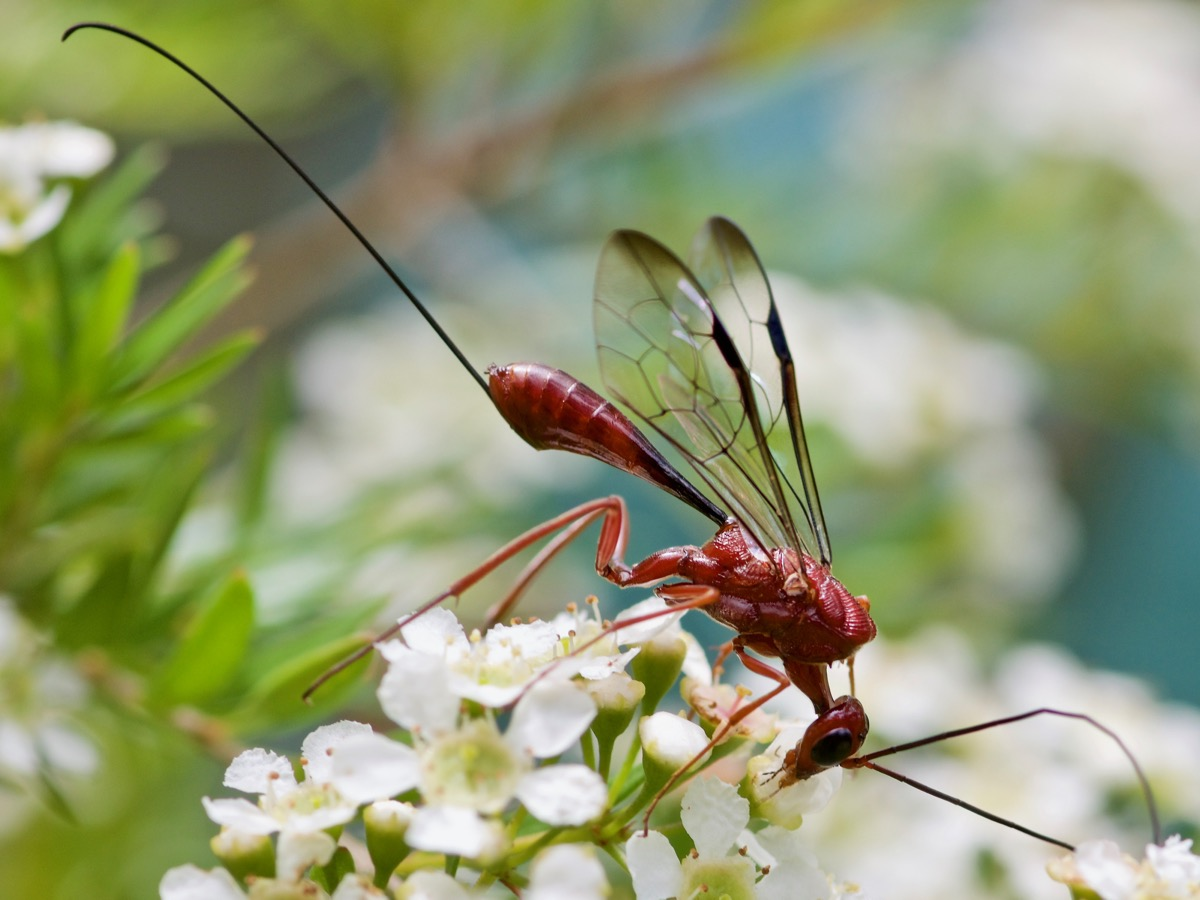
- Pristaulacus sp.

Scientific classification
- Kingdom: Animalia
- Phylum: Arthropoda
- Class: Insecta
- Order: Hymenoptera
- Superfamily: Evanioidea
- Family: Aulacidae; Shuckard, 1842

Genera
- See text.

= Aulacidae =

Aulacidae Temporal range: Albian–Present

Family of wasps

The Aulacidae are a small, cosmopolitan family of wasps, with two extant genera containing some 200 known species. They are primarily endoparasitoids of wood wasps (Xiphydriidae) and xylophagous beetles (Cerambycidae and Buprestidae). They are closely related to the family Gasteruptiidae, sharing the feature of having the first and second metasomal tergites fused, and having the head on a long pronotal "neck", though they are not nearly as slender and elongate as gasteruptiids, nor are their hind legs club-like, and they have more sculptured thoraces. They share the evanioid trait of having the metasoma attached very high above the hind coxae on the propodeum.

While generally rarely collected, they can be locally abundant in areas undergoing logging or forest fires. The rich fossil record of Aulacidae indicates they were quite abundant in the Mesozoic.

== Genera ==
Aulacidae consists of 5 genera, 3 extant and 2 extinct. They are:

- Aulacus Jurine, 1807
- †Hyptiogastrites Cockerell, 1917
- Panaulix Benoit, 1984
- Pristaulacus Kieffer, 1900
- †Vectevania Cockerell, 1922
