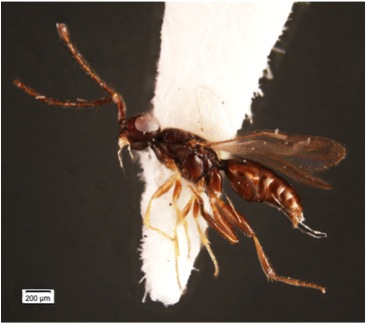
- Conostigmus sp

Scientific classification
- Kingdom: Animalia
- Phylum: Arthropoda
- Clade: Pancrustacea
- Class: Insecta
- Order: Hymenoptera
- Family: Megaspilidae
- Genus: Conostigmus; Dahlbom, 1858

Type species
- Conostigmus erythrothorax (Ashmead, 1893)

= Conostigmus =

Genus of wasps

Conostigmus is a genus of parasitoid wasps that belongs to the family Megaspilidae. It is a sister genus of Dendrocerus and the second-largest genus within the family Megaspilidae with over 170 extant species that are globally distributed with most species being concentrated in the Palaearctic realm. In contrast, there has only been 17 species described from China.

== Taxonomy ==
The genus was described in 1858 by Anders Gustaf Dahlbom, a Swedish entomologist. When it was established, it was considered to be a subgenus of Megaspilus before being elevated to the generic rank by Kieffer (1907). The type species is Conostigmus erythrothorax was described by William Harris Ashmead, an American entomologist, in 1893.

=== Species ===
This genus currently contains over 170 described species making Conostigmus the second-largest genus within the family Megaspilidae. These species are organized into several species groups.

Below is a list of species belonging to this genus:

1. Conostigmus acutus Wang & Chen, 2024
2. Conostigmus abdominalis (Boheman, 1832)
3. Conostigmus ampullaceus Dessart, 1997
4. Conostigmus aestivalis Kieffer, 1907
5. Conostigmus bipunctatus Kieffer, 1907
6. Conostigmus clayulatus Yang & Wang, 2025
7. Conostigmus dessarti Trietsch & Mikó, 2020
8. Conostigmus dimidiatus (Thomson, 1858)
9. Conostigmus duncani Trietsch, 2020
10. Conostigmus electrinus Wang & Chen, 2024
11. Conostigmus erythrothorax Ashmead, 1893 (type species)
12. Conostigmus franzinii Trietsch & Mikó, 2020
13. Conostigmus johnsoni Trietsch & Mikó, 2020
14. Conostigmus laeviceps (Ashmead, 1893)
15. Conostigmus lepus Trietsch, 2020
16. Conostigmus longiharpes Trietsch, 2020
17. Conostigmus michaeli Trietsch, 2020
18. Conostigmus minimus Trietsch & Mikó, 2020
19. Conostigmus muratorei Trietsch, 2020
20. Conostigmus musettiae Trietsch & Mikó, 2020
21. Conostigmus nankunensis Qian and Wang, 2024
22. Conostigmus obsidianus Liu & Wang, 2026
23. Conostigmus quadratogenalis Dessart & Cooper, 1975
24. Conostigmus quadripetalus Wang & Chen, 2024
25. Conostigmus rosemaryae Trietsch, 2020
26. Conostigmus rotundus Yang & Wang, 2025
27. Conostigmus vitreus Liu & Wang, 2026
28. Conostigmus washburni Trietsch, 2020
29. Conostigmus xui Cui and Wang, 2023

== Biology ==
Though it is the second largest genus within Megaspilidae, little is known about its life history. A few species are known to be ectoparasitoids however it is likely that the genus also contains endoparasitoid wasps as well since the sister genus Dendrocerus contains both life strategies. It is also likely that Conostigmus contains hyperparasitoids as well.

== Fossil Specimens ==
A species of Conostigmus has been identified from Eocene Baltic amber.
