= Parasitoid wasp =

Group of wasps

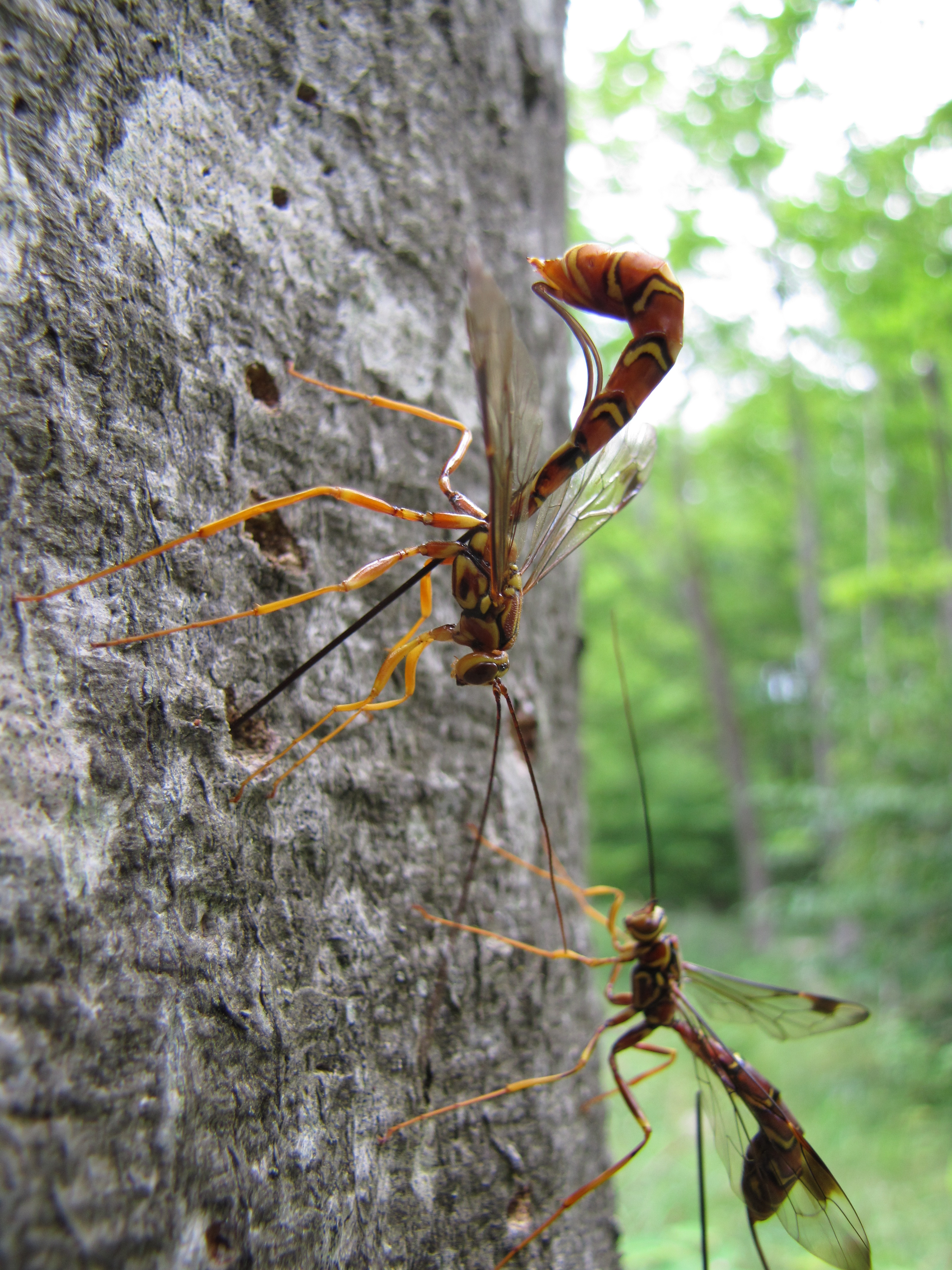
Megarhyssa macrurus (Ichneumonidae), a parasitoid, ovipositing into its host through the wood of a tree. The body of a female is c. 2 inches (50 mm) long, with an ovipositor c. 4 inches (100 mm) long.

Females of the parasitoid wasp Neoneurus vesculus (Braconidae) ovipositing in workers of the ant Formica cunicularia.

Parasitoid wasps are a large group of hymenopteran superfamilies, with all but the wood wasps (Orussoidea) being in the wasp-waisted Apocrita. As parasitoids, they lay their eggs on or in the bodies of other arthropods, sooner or later causing the death of these hosts. Different species specialise in hosts from different insect orders, most often Lepidoptera, though some select beetles, flies, or bugs; the spider wasps (Pompilidae) exclusively attack spiders.

Parasitoid wasp species differ in which host life-stage they attack: eggs, larvae, pupae, or adults. They mainly follow one of two major strategies within parasitism: either they are endoparasitic, developing inside the host, and koinobiont, allowing the host to continue to feed, develop, and moult; or they are ectoparasitic, developing outside the host, and idiobiont, paralysing the host immediately. Some endoparasitic wasps of the superfamily Ichneumonoidea have a mutualistic relationship with polydnaviruses, the viruses suppressing the host's immune defenses.

Parasitoidism evolved only once in the Hymenoptera, during the Permian, leading to a single clade called Euhymenoptera, but the parasitic lifestyle has secondarily been lost several times including among the ants, bees, and vespid wasps. As a result, the order Hymenoptera contains many families of parasitoids, intermixed with non-parasitoid groups. The parasitoid wasps include some very large groups, some estimates giving the Chalcidoidea as many as 500,000 species, the Ichneumonidae 100,000 species, and the Braconidae up to 50,000 species. Host insects have evolved a range of defences against parasitoid wasps, including hiding, wriggling, and camouflage markings.

Many parasitoid wasps are considered beneficial to humans because they naturally control agricultural pests. Some are applied commercially in biological pest control, starting in the 1920s with Encarsia formosa to control whitefly in greenhouses. Historically, parasitoidism in wasps influenced the thinking of Charles Darwin.

== Parasitoidism ==
Two strategies found among parasitoidal wasps: Ectoparasites are usually idiobiont, endoparasites koinobiont.

Parasitoid wasps range from some of the smallest species of insects to wasps about an inch (25 mm) long. Most females have a long, sharp ovipositor at the tip of the abdomen, sometimes lacking venom glands, and almost never modified into a sting outside of the aculeate groups.

Parasitoids can be classified in many ways. They can live within their host's body as endoparasitoids, or feed on it from outside as ectoparasitoids: both strategies are found among the wasps. Parasitoids can also be divided according to their effect on their hosts. Idiobionts prevent further development of the host after initially immobilizing it, while koinobionts allow the host to continue its development while they are feeding upon it; and again, both types are seen in parasitoidal wasps. Most ectoparasitoid wasps are idiobiont, as the host could damage or dislodge the external parasitoid if allowed to move or moult. Most endoparasitoid wasps are koinobionts, giving them the advantage of a host that continues to grow larger and remains able to avoid predators.

=== Hosts ===
Many parasitoid wasps use larval Lepidoptera as hosts. Still, some groups parasitize different host life stages (egg, larva or nymph, pupa, adult) of nearly all other orders of insects, especially Coleoptera, Diptera, Hemiptera and other Hymenoptera. Some attack arthropods other than insects: for instance, the Pompilidae specialise in catching spiders: these are quick and dangerous prey, often as large as the wasp itself, but the spider wasp is quicker, swiftly stinging her prey to immobilise it. Adult female wasps of most species oviposit into their hosts' bodies or eggs. More rarely, parasitoid wasps may use plant seeds as hosts, such as Torymus druparum.

Some also inject a mix of secretory products that paralyse the host or protect the egg from the host's immune system; these include polydnaviruses, ovarian proteins, and venom. If a polydnavirus is included, it infects the nuclei of host haemocytes and other cells, causing symptoms that benefit the parasite.

Host size is important for the development of the parasitoid, as the host is its entire food supply until it emerges as an adult; small hosts often produce smaller parasitoids. Some species preferentially lay female eggs in larger hosts and male eggs in smaller hosts, as the reproductive capabilities of males are limited less severely by smaller adult body size.

Some parasitoid wasps mark the host with chemical signals to show that an egg has been laid there. This may both deter rivals from ovipositing and signal to itself that no further egg is needed in that host, effectively reducing the chances that offspring will have to compete for food and increasing the offspring's survival.

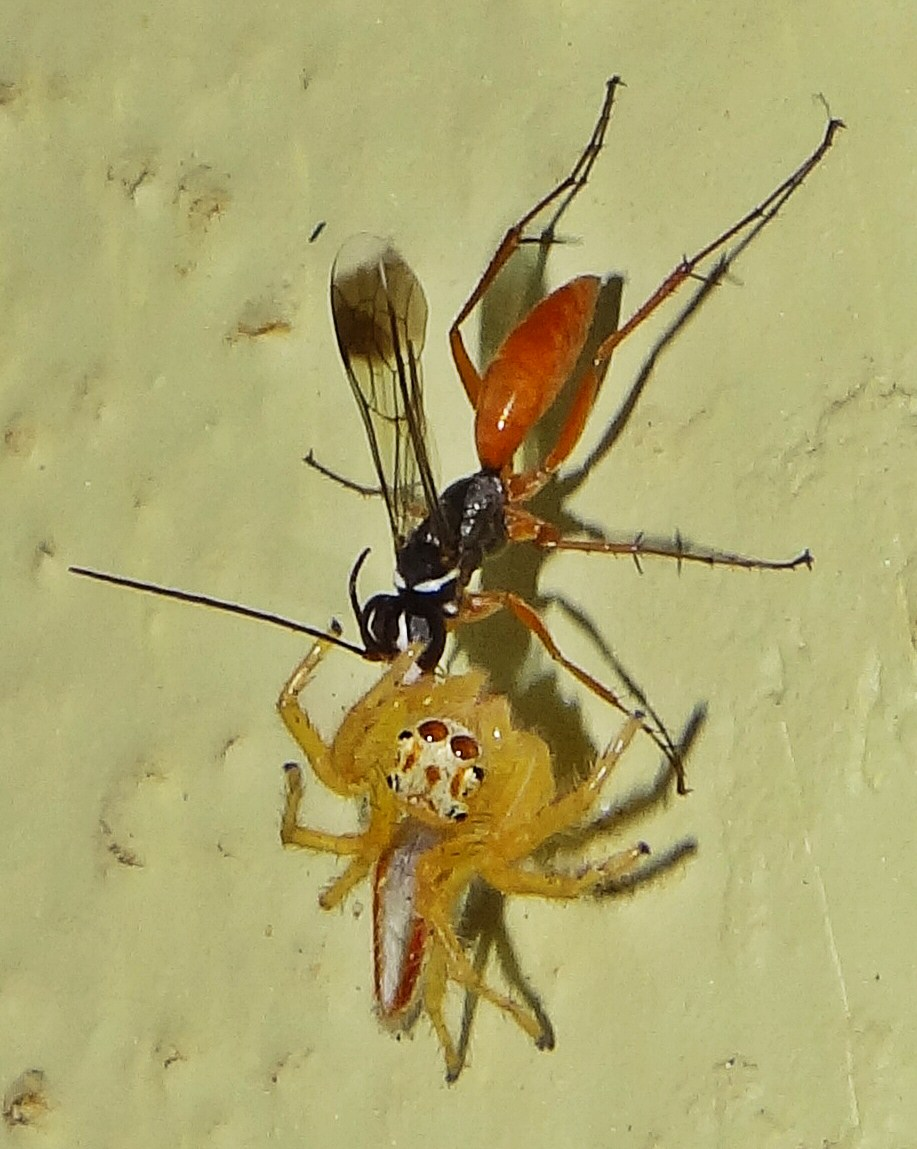
Spider wasp (Pompilidae), an idiobiont, carrying a jumping spider she has just paralysed back to her nest, where she lays an egg on it.

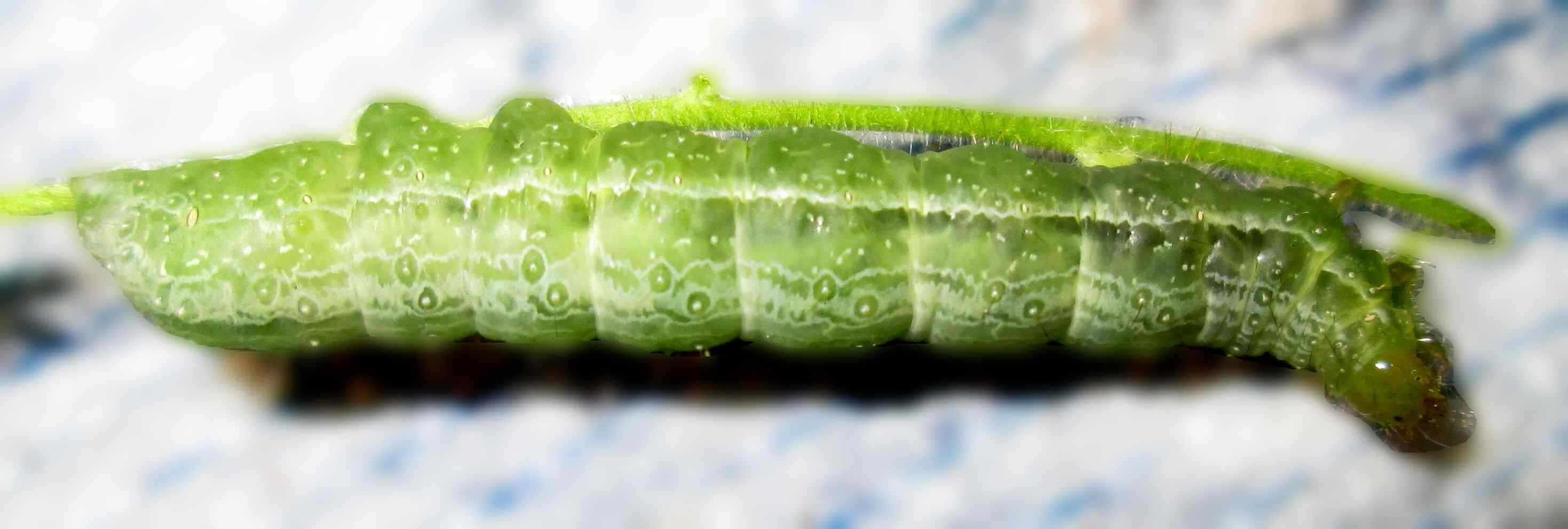
An apparently healthy moth caterpillar feeds, grows, and moults...

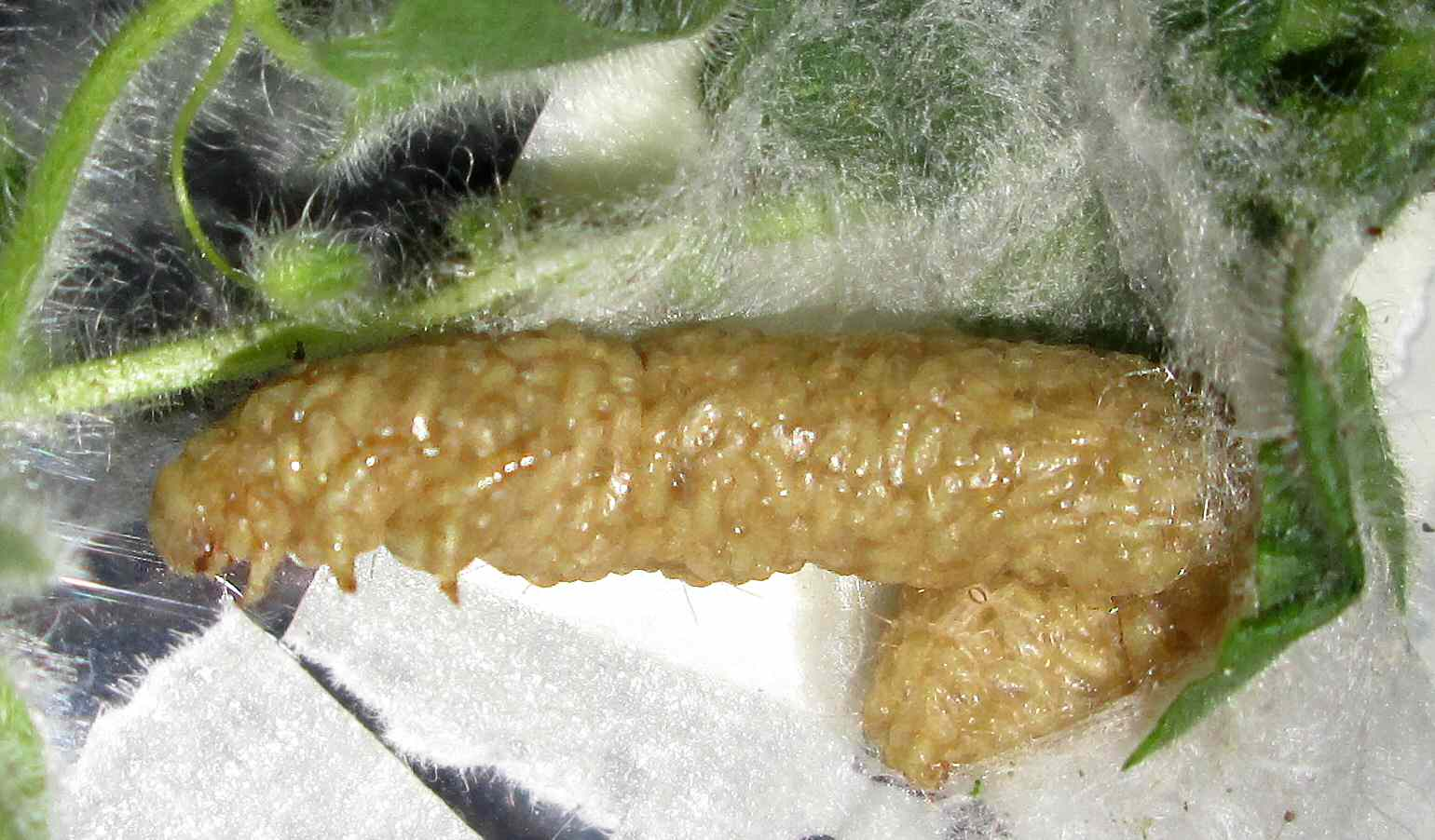
but endoparasitic koinobiont wasp larvae eventually fill its body and kill it.

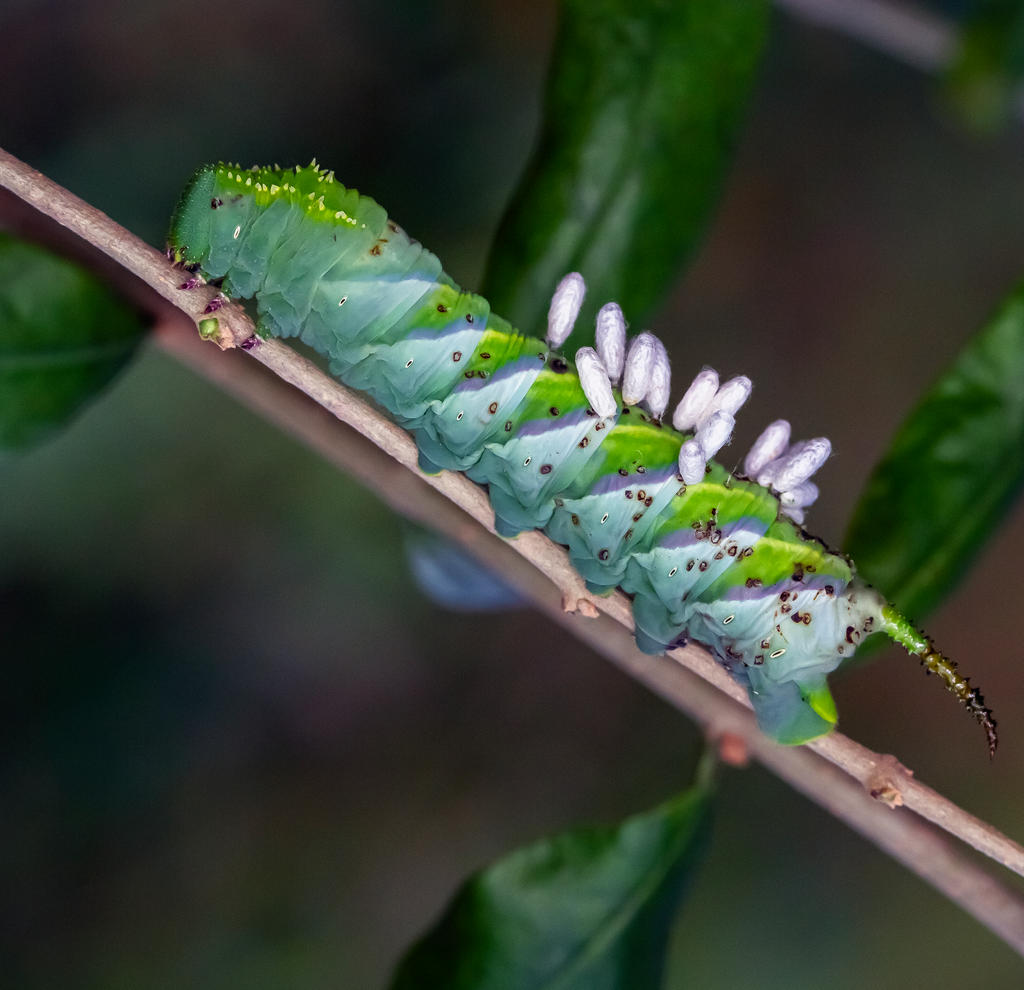
Hornworm with parasitic wasp cocoons

Parasitized white cabbage larvae showing wasp larvae exiting its body, spinning cocoons. Playback at double speed. Adult wasps at normal speed

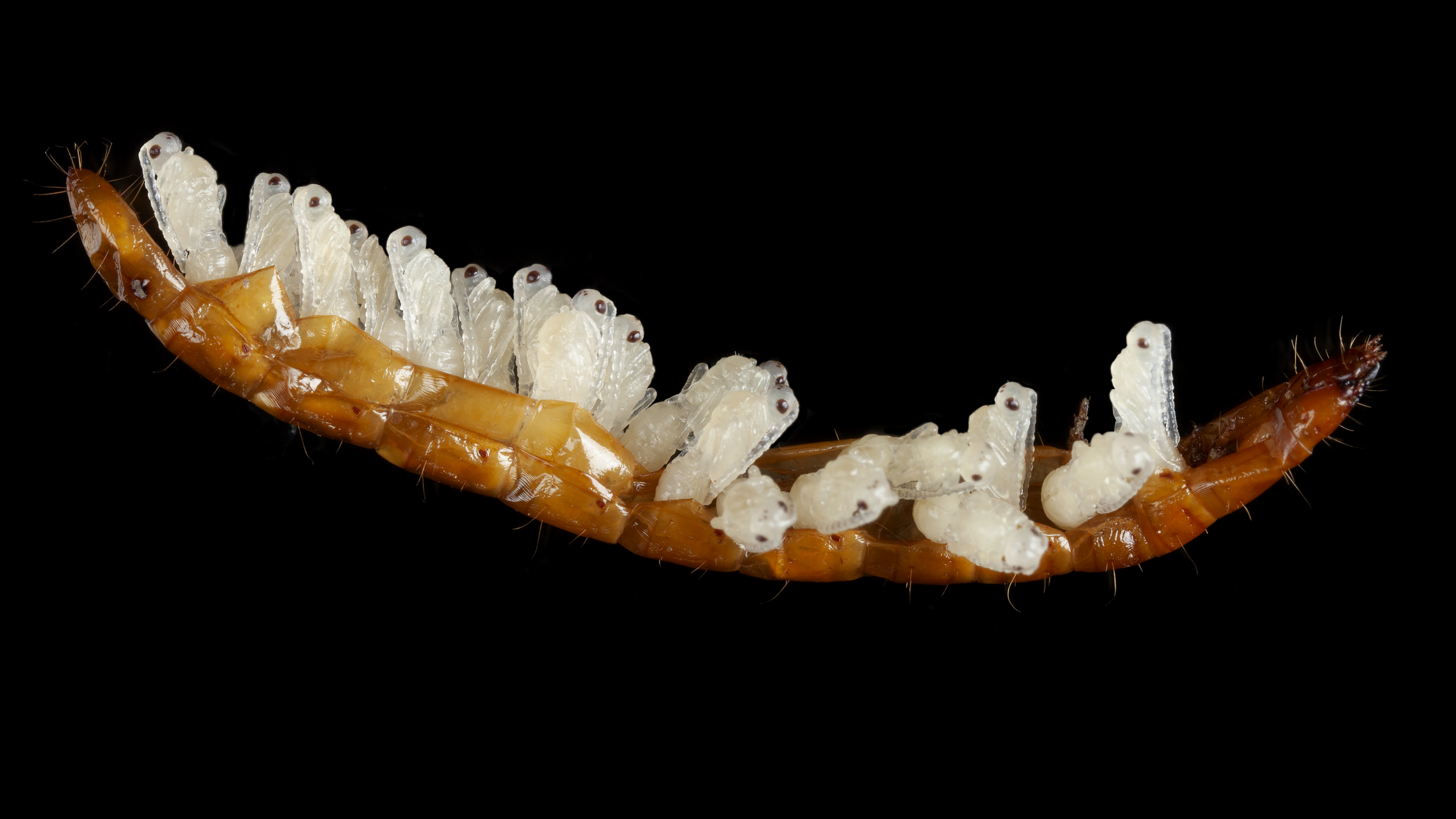
Paracodrus apterogynus pupae inside the remains of a click beetle larva.

=== Life cycle ===
On or inside the host, the parasitoid egg hatches into a larva or two or more larvae (polyembryony). Endoparasitoid eggs can absorb fluids from the host body and grow several times in size from when they were first laid before hatching. The first instar larvae are often highly mobile and may have strong mandibles or other structures to compete with other parasitoid larvae. The following instars are generally more grub-like. Parasitoid larvae have incomplete digestive systems with no rear opening. This prevents the hosts from being contaminated by their wastes. The larva feeds on the host's tissues until ready to pupate; by then, the host is generally either dead or almost so. A meconium, or the accumulated wastes from the larva, is cast out as the larva transitions to a prepupa. Depending on its species, the parasitoid then may eat its way out of the host or remain in the more or less empty skin. In either case, it then generally spins a cocoon and pupates. As adults, parasitoid wasps feed primarily on nectar from flowers. Females of some species drink haemolymph from hosts to gain additional nutrients for egg production.

Polydnavirus-wasp mutualism: the virus protects koinobiont wasp eggs and larvae from immune suppression by the host's haemocytes.

=== Mutualism with polydnavirus ===
Polydnaviruses are a unique group of insect viruses that have a mutualistic relationship with some parasitic wasps. The polydnavirus replicates in the oviducts of an adult female parasitoid wasp. The wasp benefits from this relationship because the virus protects the parasitic larvae inside the host, (i) by weakening the host's immune system and (ii) by altering the host's cells to be more beneficial to the parasite. The relationship between these viruses and the wasp is obligatory in the sense that all individuals are infected with the viruses; the virus has been incorporated in the wasp's genome and is inherited.

== Host defences ==
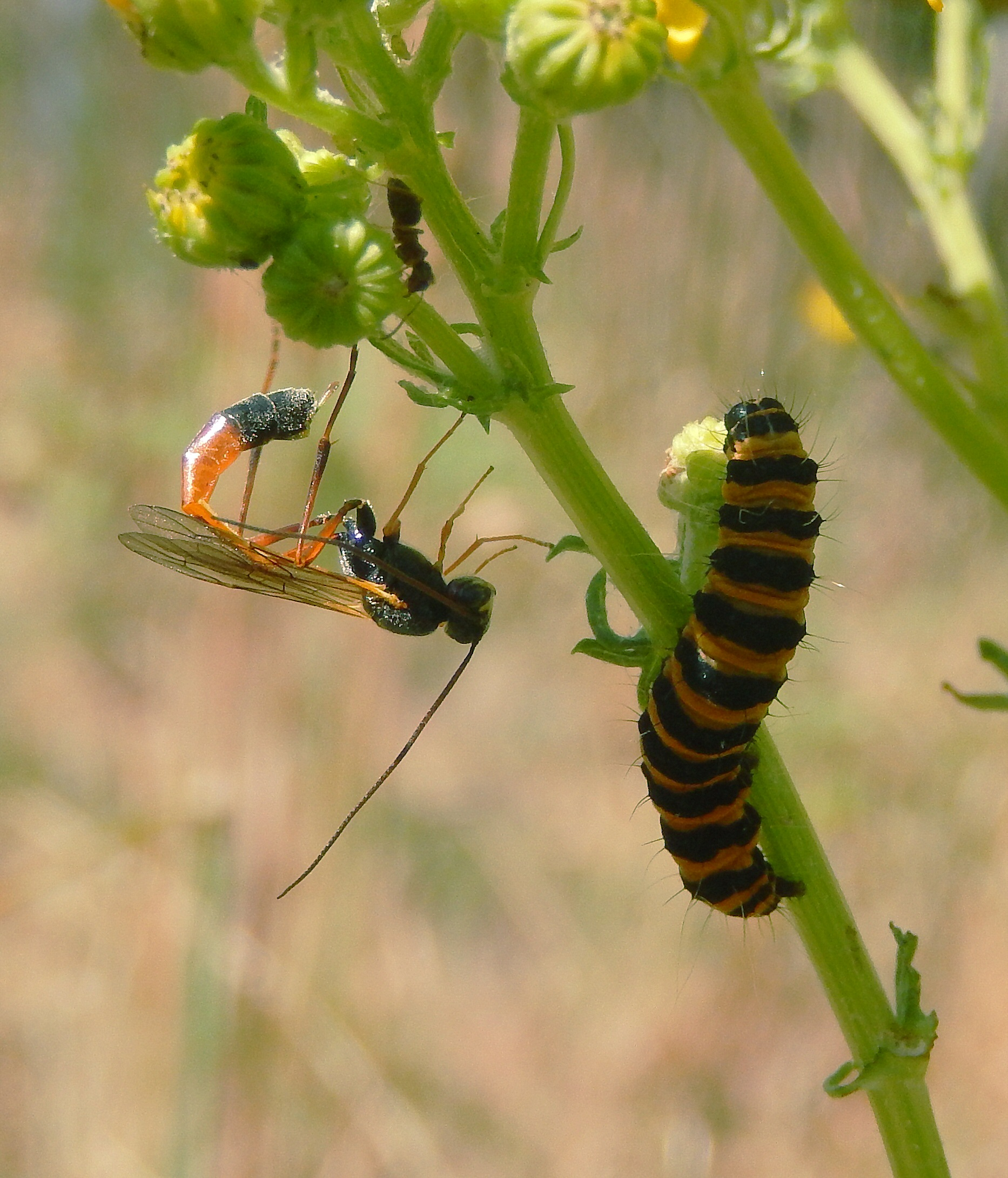
Parasitoid wasp (Ichneumonidae) pointing ovipositor at cinnabar moth larva, just after ovipositing. The larva wriggles vigorously to try to avoid the attack.

A milkweed aphid pushes the sticky wax drop from its cornicle against an attacking parasitic wasp, extruding another drop. Two scenes at one-tenth speed. A different aphid has captured a wasp.

The hosts of parasitoids have developed several levels of defence. Many hosts try to hide from the parasitoids in inaccessible habitats. They may also get rid of their frass (body wastes) and avoid plants that they have chewed on, as both can signal their presence to parasitoids hunting for hosts. The egg shells and cuticles of the potential hosts are thickened to prevent the parasitoid from penetrating them. Hosts may use behavioral evasion when they encounter an egg-laying female parasitoid, like dropping off the plant they are on, twisting and thrashing to dislodge or kill the female, and even regurgitating onto the wasp to entangle it. The wriggling can sometimes help by causing the wasp to "miss" laying the egg on the host and instead place it nearby. Wriggling of pupae can cause the wasp to lose its grip on the smooth, hard pupa or get trapped in the silk strands. Some caterpillars even bite the female wasps that approach them. Some insects secrete poisonous compounds that kill or drive away the parasitoid. Ants that are in a symbiotic relationship with caterpillars, aphids or scale insects may protect them from attack by wasps.

Parasitoid wasps are vulnerable to hyperparasitoid wasps. Some parasitoid wasps change the behavior of the infected host, causing them to build a silk web around the pupae of the wasps after they emerge from its body to protect them from hyperparasitoids.

Hosts can kill endoparasitoids by sticking haemocytes to the egg or larva in a process called encapsulation. In aphids, the presence of a particular species of γ-3 Pseudomonadota makes the aphid relatively immune to their parasitoid wasps by killing many of the eggs. As the parasitoid's survival depends on its ability to evade the host's immune response, some parasitoid wasps have developed the counterstrategy of laying more eggs in aphids that have the endosymbiont, so that at least one of them may hatch and parasitize the aphid.

Certain caterpillars eat plants that are toxic to both themselves and the parasite to cure themselves. Drosophila melanogaster larvae also self-medicate with ethanol to treat parasitism. D. melanogaster females lay their eggs in food containing toxic amounts of alcohol if they detect parasitoid wasps nearby. The alcohol protects them from the wasps, at the cost of retarding their own growth.

== Evolution and taxonomy ==
=== Evolution ===
Based on genetic and fossil analysis, parasitoidism has evolved only once in the Hymenoptera, during the Permian, leading to a single clade. All parasitoid wasps are descended from this lineage. The narrow-waisted Apocrita emerged during the Jurassic. The Aculeata, which includes bees, ants, and parasitoid spider wasps, evolved from within the Apocrita; it contains many families of parasitoids, though not the Ichneumonoidea, Cynipoidea, and Chalcidoidea. The Hymenoptera, Apocrita, and Aculeata are all clades, but since each of these contains non-parasitic species, the parasitoid wasps, formerly known as the Parasitica, do not form a clade on their own. The common ancestor in which parasitoidism evolved lived approximately 247 million years ago and was previously believed to be an ectoparasitoid wood wasp that fed on wood-boring beetle larvae. Species similar in lifestyle and morphology to this ancestor still exist in the Ichneumonoidea. However, recent molecular and morphological analysis suggests this ancestor was endophagous, meaning it fed from within its host. A significant radiation of species in the Hymenoptera occurred shortly after the evolution of parasitoidy in the order and is thought to have been a result of it. The evolution of a wasp waist, a constriction in the abdomen of the Apocrita, contributed to rapid diversification as it increased the maneuverability of the ovipositor, the organ of the rear segment of the abdomen used to lay eggs.

The phylogenetic tree gives a condensed overview of the positions of parasitoidal groups (boldface), amongst groups like the Vespidae which have secondarily abandoned the parasitoid habit. Not all species in these groups are parasitoidal: for example, within the Cynipoidea, the Cynipidae (gall wasps) are phytophagous. The approximate numbers of species estimated to be in these groups, often much larger than the number so far described, are shown in parentheses, with estimates for the most populous also shown in boldface, like "(150,000)".

- Hymenoptera
  - "Symphyta" no waist
    sawflies
  - parasitoidism evolved once
    - **Orussoidea** no waist
      (wood wasps, 85)
    - **Apocrita** wasp waist
      - **Ichneumonoidea** long ovipositor
        (**150,000**)
      - - **Proctotrupomorpha** mainly small
          - **Cynipoidea** (3,000)
          - - **Proctotrupoidea** (400)
            - **Platygastroidea** (4000)
            - **Chalcidoidea** (**500,000**)
          - other Superfamilies
        - **Aculeata** stinging
          - **Chrysididae** (jewel wasps, 3000)
          - - Vespidae (wasps, hornets, 5000)
            - - - **Mutillidae** (velvet ants, 3000)
                - **Pompilidae** (spider wasps, 5000)
                - other families
              - - **Scoliidae** (560)
                - - Formicidae (ants, 22,000)
                  - Apoidea
                    - **Ampulicidae** (170)
                    - - **Sphecidae** (700)
                      - - Bembicidae (1800)
                        - - other families
                          - - - Pemphredonidae (aphid wasps, 556)
                              - Philanthidae (1100)
                            - - Anthophila (bees, 22,000)
                              - Ammoplanidae (aphid wasps, 130)

=== Taxonomy ===
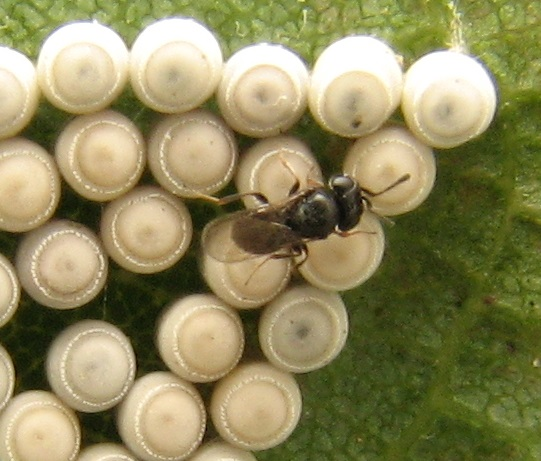
Trissolcus parasitoid wasp (family Scelionidae) on Chinavia shield bug eggs

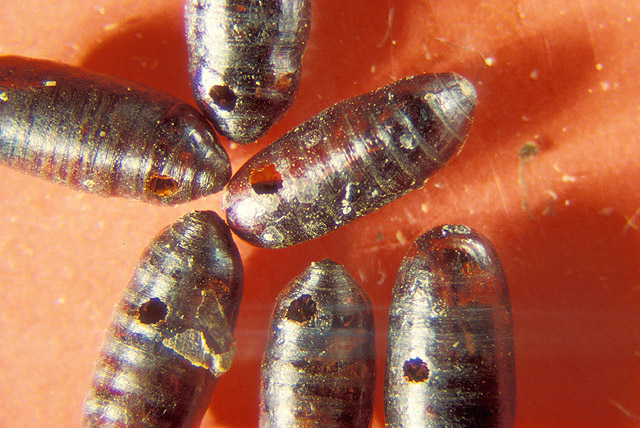
Housefly pupae killed by parasitoid wasp larvae (probably Pteromalidae). Each pupa has a hole through which an adult wasp has emerged after feeding on the housefly larva.

The parasitoid wasps are paraphyletic since the ants, bees, and non-parasitic wasps such as the Vespidae are not included, and there are many members of mainly parasitoidal families which are not themselves parasitic. Listed are Hymenopteran families where most members have a parasitoid lifestyle.

Symphyta:

- Orussidae

Apocrita:

- Scolebythidae
- Bethylidae
- Chrysididae
- Sclerogibbidae
- Dryinidae
- Embolemidae
- Tiphiidae
- Thynnidae
- Sapygidae
- Mutillidae
- Bradynobaenidae
- Chyphotidae
- Sierolomorphidae
- Braconidae
- Ichneumonidae
- Pompilidae
- Rhopalosomatidae
- Aulacidae
- Evaniidae
- Gasteruptiidae
- Stephanidae
- Megalyridae
- Trigonalidae
- Ibaliidae
- Liopteridae
- Figitidae
- Austroniidae
- Diapriidae
- Heloridae
- Monomachidae
- Pelecinidae
- Peradeniidae
- Proctotrupidae
- Roproniidae
- Vanhorniidae
- Platygastridae
- Scelionidae
- Megaspilidae
- Ceraphronidae
- Mymarommatidae
- Chalcidoidea (19 families)
- Ampulicidae

== Interactions with humans ==
=== Biological pest control ===
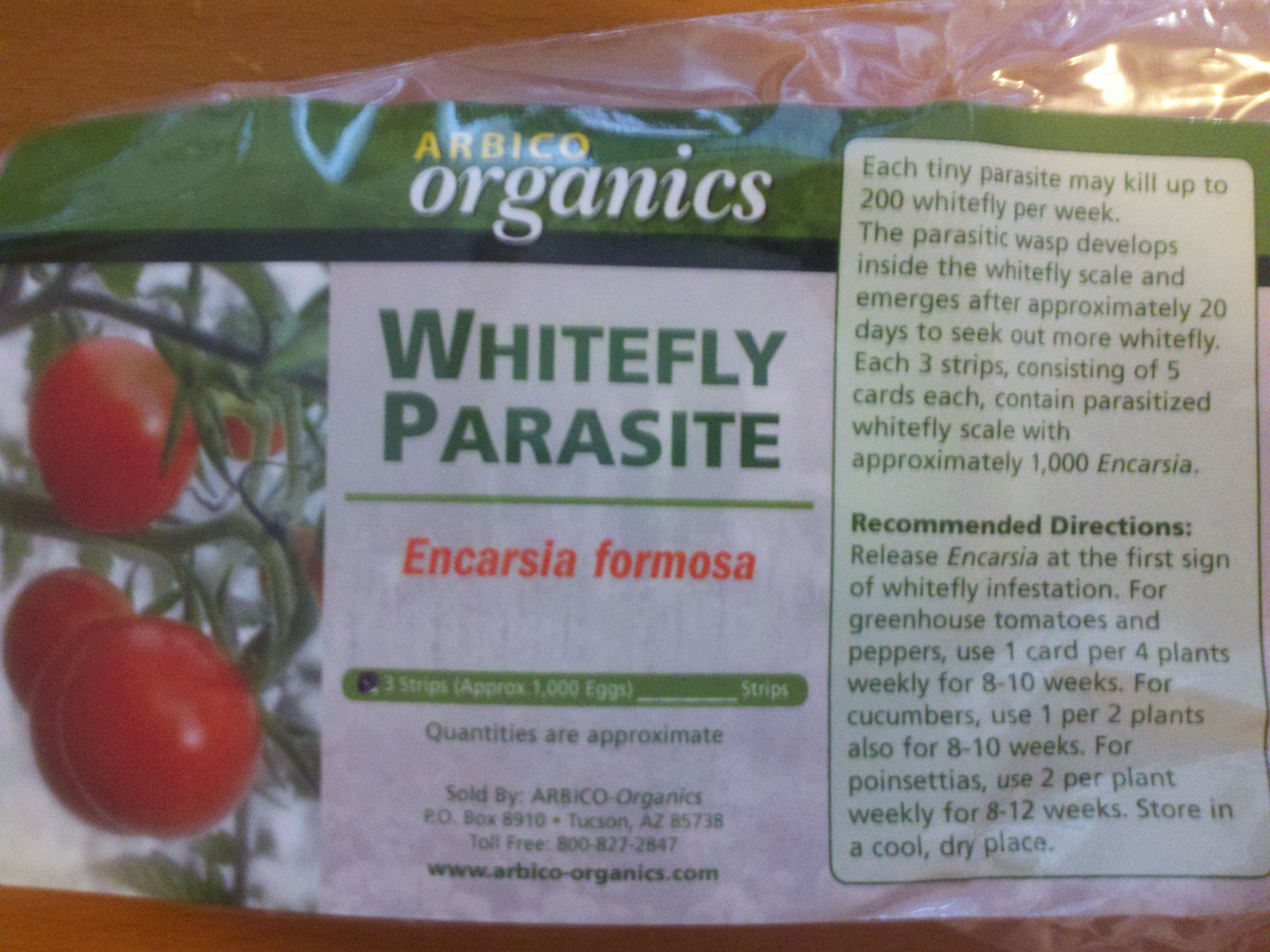
Encarsia formosa, an endoparasitic aphelinid wasp, bred commercially to control whitefly in greenhouses

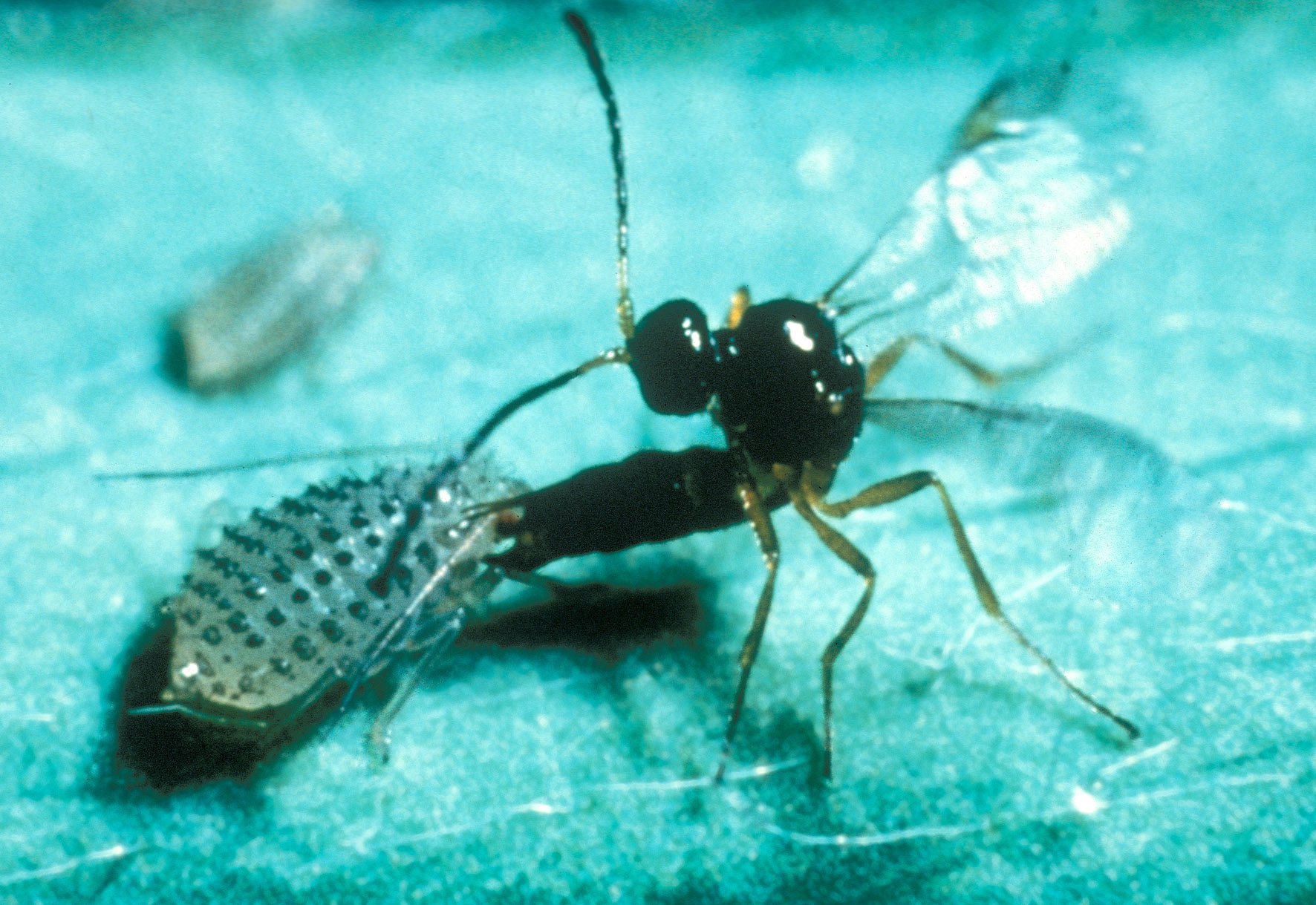
Trioxys complanatus, (Aphidiinae) ovipositing into a spotted alfalfa aphid, a commercial pest in Australia. (Note: Trioxys complanatus has been introduced to Australia to control the spotted alfalfa aphid.)

Parasitoid wasps are considered beneficial as they naturally control the population of many pest insects. They are widely used commercially (alongside other parasitoids such as tachinid flies) for biological pest control, for which the most important groups are the ichneumonid wasps, which prey mainly on caterpillars of butterflies and moths; braconid wasps, which attack caterpillars and a wide range of other insects including greenfly; chalcidoid wasps, which parasitise eggs and larvae of greenfly, whitefly, cabbage caterpillars, and scale insects.

One of the first parasitoid wasps to enter commercial use was Encarsia formosa, an endoparasitic aphelinid. It has been used to control whitefly in greenhouses since the 1920s. Use of the insect fell almost to nothing, replaced by chemical pesticides by the 1940s. Since the 1970s, usage has revived, with renewed usage in Europe and Russia. In some countries, such as New Zealand, it is the primary biological control agent used to control greenhouse whiteflies, particularly on crops such as tomato, a difficult plant for predators to establish on.

Commercially, there are two types of rearing systems: short-term seasonal daily output with high production of parasitoids per day, and long-term year-round low daily output with a range in production of 4–1000 million female parasitoids per week as of 1996, to meet demand for suitable parasitoids for different crops.

=== In culture ===
Parasitoid wasps influenced the thinking of Charles Darwin. (Note: Darwin mentions "parasitic" wasps in On the Origin of Species, Chapter 7, page 218.) In an 1860 letter to the American naturalist Asa Gray, Darwin wrote: "I cannot persuade myself that a beneficent and omnipotent God would have designedly created parasitic wasps with the express intention of their feeding within the living bodies of Caterpillars." The palaeontologist Donald Prothero notes that religiously minded people of the Victorian era, including Darwin, were horrified by this instance of evident cruelty in nature, particularly noticeable in the Ichneumonidae.
