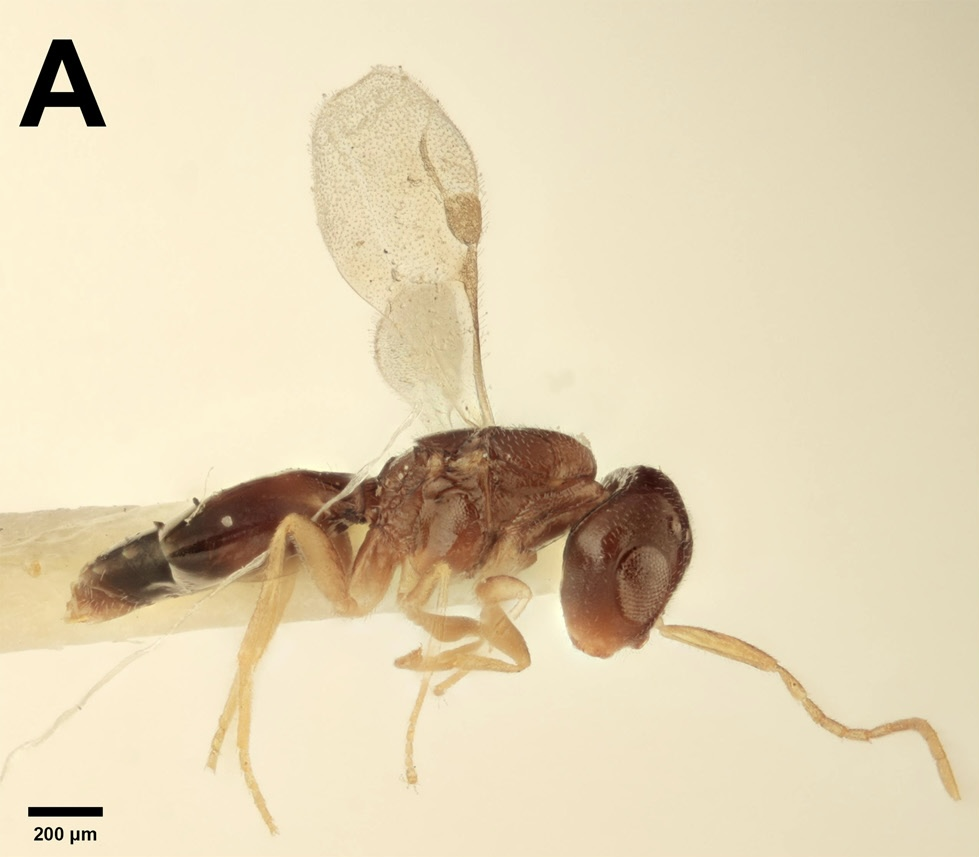

Scientific classification
- Kingdom: Animalia
- Phylum: Arthropoda
- Clade: Pancrustacea
- Class: Insecta
- Order: Hymenoptera
- Family: Megaspilidae
- Genus: Conostigmus
- Species: C. quadratogenalis

Binomial name
- Conostigmus quadratogenalis (Dessart & Cooper, 1975)

= Conostigmus quadratogenalis =

Conostigmus quadratogenalis is a parasitoid wasp species. Unlike many others in the family Megaspilidae, it is an endoparasitoid. It uses the snow scorpionfly species Hesperoboreus notoperates as its host.

== Description and Distribution ==
C. quadratogenalis has a brown to ochre body with ochre legs. It can be distinguished from all other species in its genus via its square shaped head.

It is found in the Nearctic.

== Ethology ==
C. quadratogenalis larvae are endoparasites of H. notoperates larvae, and both species complete their larval feeding stages at the same time.

The emergence of its host, the snow scorpionfly, as adults depends on the presence of rainfall softening its pupal wall. In periods of low rainfall or drought, this means some snow scorpionflies may not emerge, and instead go dormant (aestivation) until a later season, resulting in multiple generations a year.

In response to this, some C. quadratogenalis larvae continue to transform into pupae and emerge as adults to parasitise the year’s first generation of host imagoes; whereas others enter a facultative diapause, delaying their own development and emerging 2-4 months later alongside the year’s aestivating second generation. This enables it to always be present alongside available host larvae.
