= List of Dendrocerus species =

This is a list of 103 species in Dendrocerus, a genus of ceraphronoid wasp in the family Megaspilidae.

== Dendrocerus species ==
- Dendrocerus aberrans Alekseev, 1994^{i c g}
- Dendrocerus acrossopteryx Dessart, 1985^{i c g}
- Dendrocerus aequatorialis Dessart, 1999^{i c g}
- Dendrocerus africanus (Risbec, 1958)^{i c g}
- Dendrocerus alaskensis (Ashmead, 1902)^{i c g}
- Dendrocerus aliberti (Risbec, 1950)^{i c g}
- Dendrocerus aloha Dessart, 1994^{i c g}
- Dendrocerus amamensis Takada, 1974^{i c g}
- Dendrocerus americanus (Ashmead, 1893)^{i c g}
- Dendrocerus angustus Dessart, 1999^{i c g}
- Dendrocerus anneckei Dessart, 1985^{i c g}
- Dendrocerus anomaliventris (Ashmead, 1893)^{i c g}
- Dendrocerus antennalis (Kieffer, 1907)^{i c g}
- Dendrocerus aphidum (Rondani, 1877)^{i c g}
- Dendrocerus applanatus Dessart, 1972^{i c g}
- Dendrocerus araucanus Dessart, 1999^{i c g}
- Dendrocerus australicus (Dodd, 1914)^{i c g}
- Dendrocerus basalis (Thomson, 1858)^{i c g}
- Dendrocerus bicolor (Kieffer, 1907)^{g}
- Dendrocerus bifoveatus (Kieffer, 1907)^{i c g}
- Dendrocerus bispinosus (Kieffer, 1907)^{i c g}
- Dendrocerus breadalbimensis (Kieffer, 1907)^{g}
- Dendrocerus caelebs Dessart, 1999^{i c g}
- Dendrocerus californicus (Ashmead, 1893)^{i c}
- Dendrocerus carpenteri (Curtis, 1829)^{i c g}
- Dendrocerus castaneus (Kieffer, 1907)^{i c g}
- Dendrocerus chilocori (Ishii, 1951)^{i c g}
- Dendrocerus chloropidarum Dessart, 1990^{i c g}
- Dendrocerus ciuthan Dessart, 1994^{i c g}
- Dendrocerus constrictus (Brues, 1909)^{i c g}
- Dendrocerus conwentziae Gahan, 1919^{i c g b}
- Dendrocerus cyclopeus Dessart, 1995^{i c g}
- Dendrocerus dalhousieanus Sharma, 1983^{i c g}
- Dendrocerus dauricus (Chumakova, 1956)^{i c g}
- Dendrocerus dubiosus (Kieffer, 1907)^{g}
- Dendrocerus dubitatus (Brues, 1937)^{i c g}
- Dendrocerus ergensis (Ghesquiere, 1960)^{i c g}
- Dendrocerus femoralis Dodd, 1914^{i c g}
- Dendrocerus flavipennis (Kieffer, 1907)^{i c g}
- Dendrocerus flavipes Kieffer, 1907^{i c g}
- Dendrocerus floridanus (Ashmead, 1881)^{i c g}
- Dendrocerus fulvaster Alekseev, 1994^{i c g}
- Dendrocerus fuscipes (Ratzeburg, 1852)^{g}
- Dendrocerus hadrophthalmus Dessart, 1994^{i c g}
- Dendrocerus halidayi (Curtis, 1829)^{i c g}
- Dendrocerus henkvlugi Dessart, 1975^{i c g}
- Dendrocerus incertissimus Dessart, 1999^{i c g}
- Dendrocerus indicus (Mani, 1939)^{i c g}
- Dendrocerus katmandu Dessart, 1999^{i c g}
- Dendrocerus koyamae (Ishii, 1951)^{i c g}
- Dendrocerus laevis (Ratzeburg, 1852)^{i c g}
- Dendrocerus laticeps (Hedicke, 1929)^{i c g}
- Dendrocerus latifrons (Muesebeck, 1959)^{i c g}
- Dendrocerus leucopidis (Muesebeck, 1959)^{i c g}
- Dendrocerus liebscheri Dessart, 1972^{i c g}
- Dendrocerus mexicali Dessart, 1999^{i c g}
- Dendrocerus molestus Dessart, 1999^{i c g}
- Dendrocerus mucronifer Dessart, 1999^{i c g}
- Dendrocerus natalicius Dessart, 1985^{i c g}
- Dendrocerus natalicus Dessart, 1985^{g}
- Dendrocerus noumeae Dessart, 1967^{i c g}
- Dendrocerus omostenus Dessart, 1979^{i c g}
- Dendrocerus ornatus (Dodd, 1914)^{i c g}
- Dendrocerus pacificus (Ashmead, 1893)^{i c g}
- Dendrocerus pallipes (Harrington, 1899)^{i c g}
- Dendrocerus papu Dessart, 1999^{i c g}
- Dendrocerus paradoxus Dessart & Gaerdenfors, 1985^{i c g}
- Dendrocerus penmaricus (Ashmead, 1893)^{i c g}
- Dendrocerus perlucidus Alekseev, 1983^{i c g}
- Dendrocerus phallocrates Dessart, 1987^{i c g}
- Dendrocerus picipes (Ashmead, 1893)^{i c g}
- Dendrocerus propodealis Dessart, 1973^{i c g}
- Dendrocerus psyllarum Dessart, 1983^{i c g}
- Dendrocerus punctativentris (Dodd, 1914)^{i c g}
- Dendrocerus punctipes (Boheman, 1832)^{i c g}
- Dendrocerus pupparum (Boheman, 1832)^{i c g}
- Dendrocerus pykarus Sharma, 1983^{i c g}
- Dendrocerus ramicornis (Boheman, 1832)^{i c g}
- Dendrocerus rectangularis (Kieffer, 1907)^{i c g}
- Dendrocerus remaudierei Dessart, 1974^{i c g}
- Dendrocerus rodhaini (Bequaert, 1913)^{i c g}
- Dendrocerus rosularum (Ratzeburg, 1852)^{i c g}
- Dendrocerus rufipes (Thomson, 1858)^{g}
- Dendrocerus rufiventris (Ashmead, 1887)^{i c g}
- Dendrocerus sanmateoensis Dessart, 1966^{i c g}
- Dendrocerus sergii Alekseev, 1994^{i c g}
- Dendrocerus serricornis (Boheman, 1832)^{i c g}
- Dendrocerus sexdentatus (Ashmead, 1893)^{i c g}
- Dendrocerus solarii (Kieffer, 1907)^{i c g}
- Dendrocerus sordidus Dodd, 1914^{i c g}
- Dendrocerus splendidus (Dodd, 1914)^{i c g}
- Dendrocerus stigma (Nees von Esenbeck, 1834)^{i c g}
- Dendrocerus stigmatus (Say, 1836)^{i c g}
- Dendrocerus subtruncatus (Kieffer, 1907)^{i c g}
- Dendrocerus sylviae Dessart & Cancemi, 1987^{i c g}
- Dendrocerus tibialis Dessart, 1995^{i c g}
- Dendrocerus triticum (Taylor, 1860)^{i c g}
- Dendrocerus ulmicola Dessart & Gaerdenfors, 1985^{i c g}
- Dendrocerus variegatus Dodd, 1914^{i c g}
- Dendrocerus variipes Dodd, 1914^{i c g}
- Dendrocerus wollastoni (Dodd, 1920)^{i c g}
- Dendrocerus zhelochovtsevi Alekseev, 1979^{i c g}
- Dendrocerus zoticus Dessart, 1995^{i c g}

Data sources: i = ITIS, c = Catalogue of Life, g = GBIF, b = Bugguide.net
