= Dendrocerus conwentziae =

Scientific classification
- Kingdom: Animalia
- Phylum: Arthropoda
- Clade: Pancrustacea
- Class: Insecta
- Order: Hymenoptera
- Family: Megaspilidae
- Genus: Dendrocerus
- Species: D. conwentziae

Binomial name
- Dendrocerus conwentziae Gahan, 1919

Species of wasp

Dendrocerus conwentziae is a species of Megaspilid wasp in the family Megaspilidae. It occurs in North America from southern Mexico to southern Canada.
