= Aphanogmus kretschmanni =

Scientific classification
- Kingdom: Animalia
- Phylum: Arthropoda
- Class: Insecta
- Order: Hymenoptera
- Family: Ceraphronidae
- Genus: Aphanogmus
- Species: A. kretschmanni

Binomial name
- Aphanogmus kretschmanni Moser 2023

Species of wasp

Aphanogmus kretschmanni is a parasitic species of waist wasp (Apocrita) from the family Ceraphronidae. Multiple females of the species were found in a Malaise trap on Hirschauer Berg near Tübingen in Baden-Württemberg in 2014 and described as a new species by biologist Marina Moser in 2023.

The species was named after Winfried Kretschmann, the Minister President of Baden-Württemberg, to honour his commitment to preserving biodiversity.

When Moser presented her discovery and related work at the State Museum of Natural History Stuttgart, Kretschmann, among the guests, said that "I'm kind of overwhelmed", and that he sees the wasp species as the "most beautiful recognition of his political work" for species conservation.

The species is about 0.7-1.1 mm long. It has a dark brown head and mesosoma. The abdomen and legs are light brown. The head and mesosoma have short, whitish hairs. Special for this genus are the small spikes on the back end. A theory suggests that they are used as a sort of sew.

== Literature ==
- Moser, Marina; Ulmer, Jonah M.; Kamp, Thomas van de; Vasilița, Cristina; Renninger, Maura; Mikó, István; Krogmann, Lars (2023-04-21). "Surprising morphological diversity in ceraphronid wasps revealed by a distinctive new species of Aphanogmus (Hymenoptera: Ceraphronoidea)". European Journal of Taxonomy (864): 146–166. doi:10.5852/ejt.2023.864.2095. ISSN 2118-9773.
