= Cenchrus (disambiguation) =

Cenchrus is a genus of about 25 species of grasses.

Cenchrus may also refer to:

- Cenchrus (insect anatomy), a specialized anatomical structure in the insect group known as sawflies
- A taxonomic synonym for Agkistrodon, a.k.a. moccasins, a genus of venomous vipers found in Central and North America than include, cantils, copperheads and cottonmouths
- A taxonomic synonym for Candoia, a.k.a. bevel-nosed boas, a genus of harmless boas found in Melanesia and New Guinea
