= Conostigmus erythrothorax =

Scientific classification
- Kingdom: Animalia
- Phylum: Arthropoda
- Class: Insecta
- Order: Hymenoptera
- Family: Megaspilidae
- Genus: Conostigmus
- Species: C. erythrothorax

Binomial name
- Conostigmus erythrothorax (Ashmead, 1893)

Species of wasp

Conostigmus erythrothorax is a species of Megaspilid wasp in the family Megaspilidae.
