= Trichosteresis glabra =

Scientific classification
- Kingdom: Animalia
- Phylum: Arthropoda
- Class: Insecta
- Order: Hymenoptera
- Family: Megaspilidae
- Genus: Trichosteresis
- Species: T. glabra

Binomial name
- Trichosteresis glabra (Boheman, 1832)

Species of wasp

Trichosteresis glabra is a species of Megaspilid wasp in the family Megaspilidae. It is found in Europe. It is a parasitoid of syrphid puparia.
