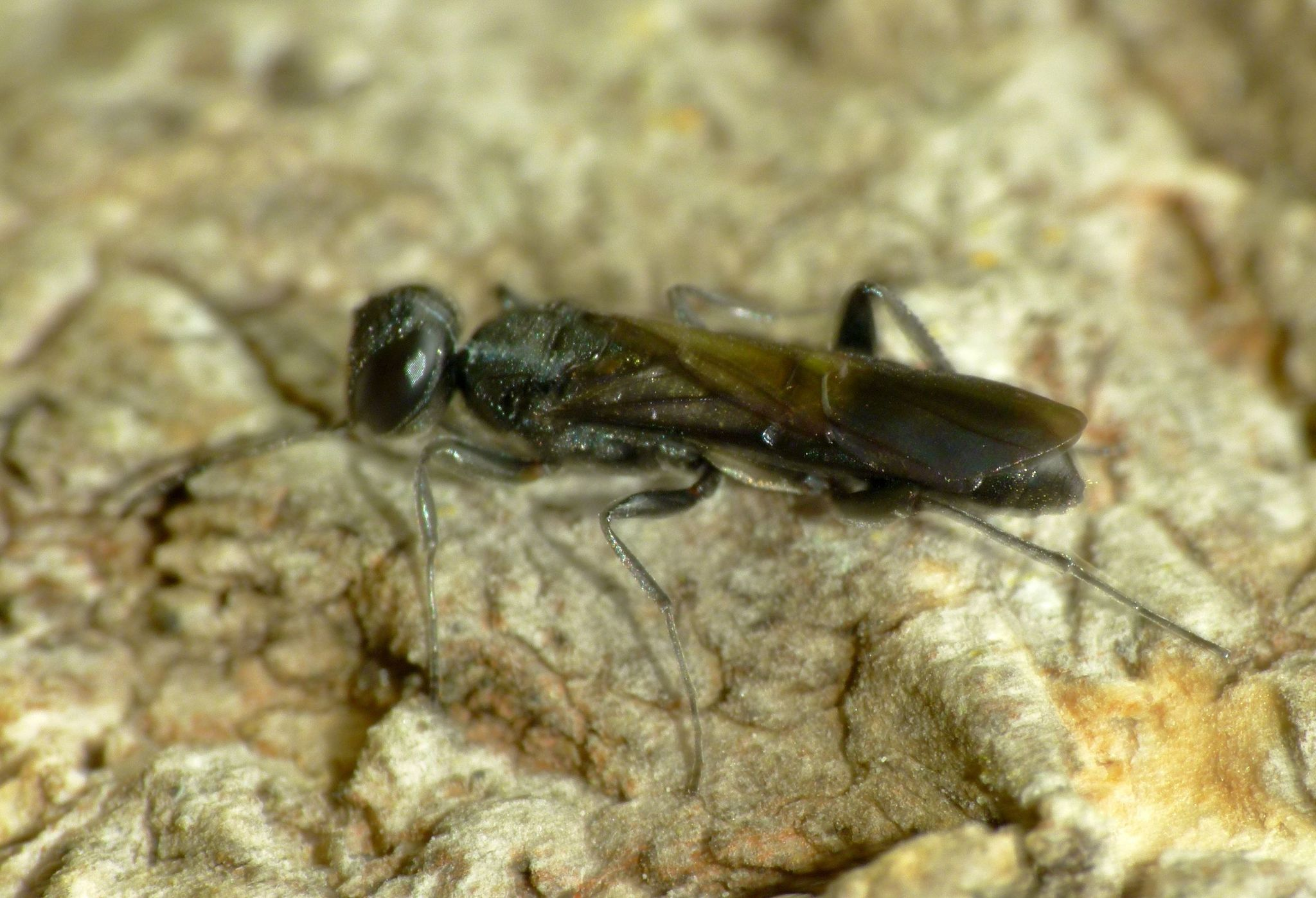
- Tomahawk Lagoon, Dunedin, Otago, New Zealand

Scientific classification
- Kingdom: Animalia
- Phylum: Arthropoda
- Clade: Pancrustacea
- Class: Insecta
- Order: Hymenoptera
- Family: Orussidae
- Genus: Guiglia
- Species: G. schauinslandi

Binomial name
- Guiglia schauinslandi (Ashmead, 1903)

Synonyms
- Ophrynopus schauinslandi Ashmead, 1903

= Guiglia schauinslandi =

Species of sawfly

Guiglia schauinslandi is a species of parasitic wood wasp in the genus Guiglia. This species was first described in 1903 by William Harris Ashmead and originally named Ophrynopus schauinslandi. It is endemic to New Zealand. The larval host of G. schauinslandi is Sirex noctilio.
