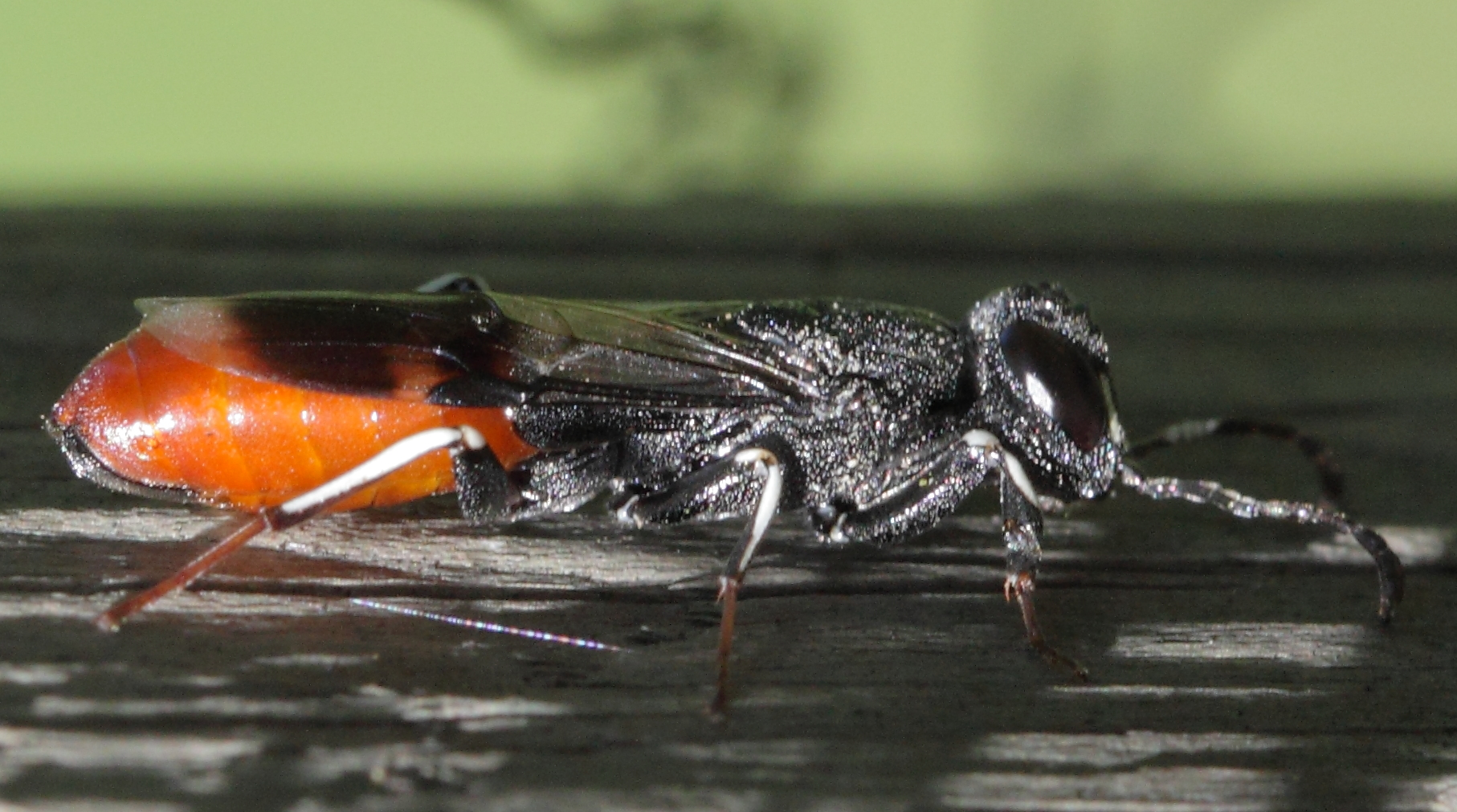
- Orussus abietinus
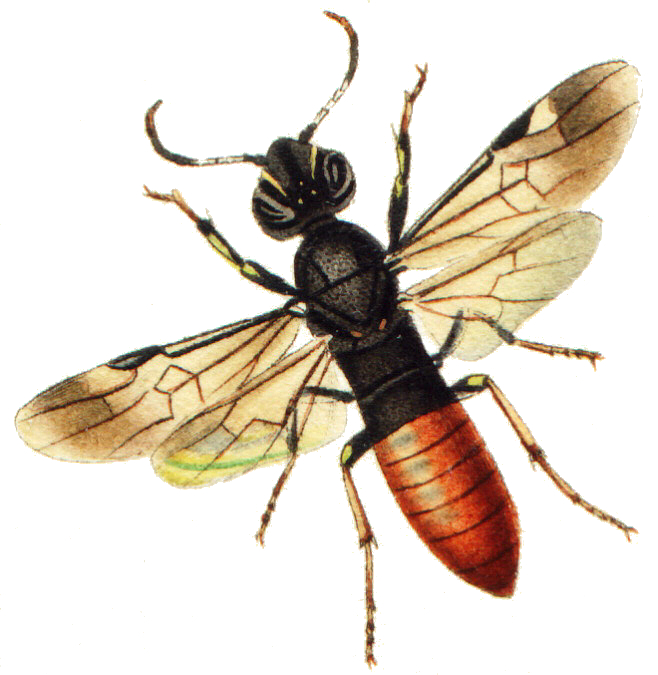
- Orussus coronatus Fabricius, 1798, junior synonym of O. abietinus (Scopoli, 1763) and type species of Orussus Latreille, 1797.

Scientific classification
- Kingdom: Animalia
- Phylum: Arthropoda
- Clade: Pancrustacea
- Class: Insecta
- Order: Hymenoptera
- Superfamily: Orussoidea
- Family: Orussidae; Newman, 1834

Type genus
- Orussus

Genera
- Argentophrynopus; Chalinus; Guiglia; Kulcania; Leptorussus; Mocsarya; Ophrella; Ophrynon; Ophrynopus; Orussella; Orussobaius; Orussonia; Orussus; Pedicrista; Pseudoryssus; Stirocorsia †Baltorussus †Mesorussus †Minyorussus

= Orussidae =

Orussidae Temporal range: Turonian-Present

Family of wasps

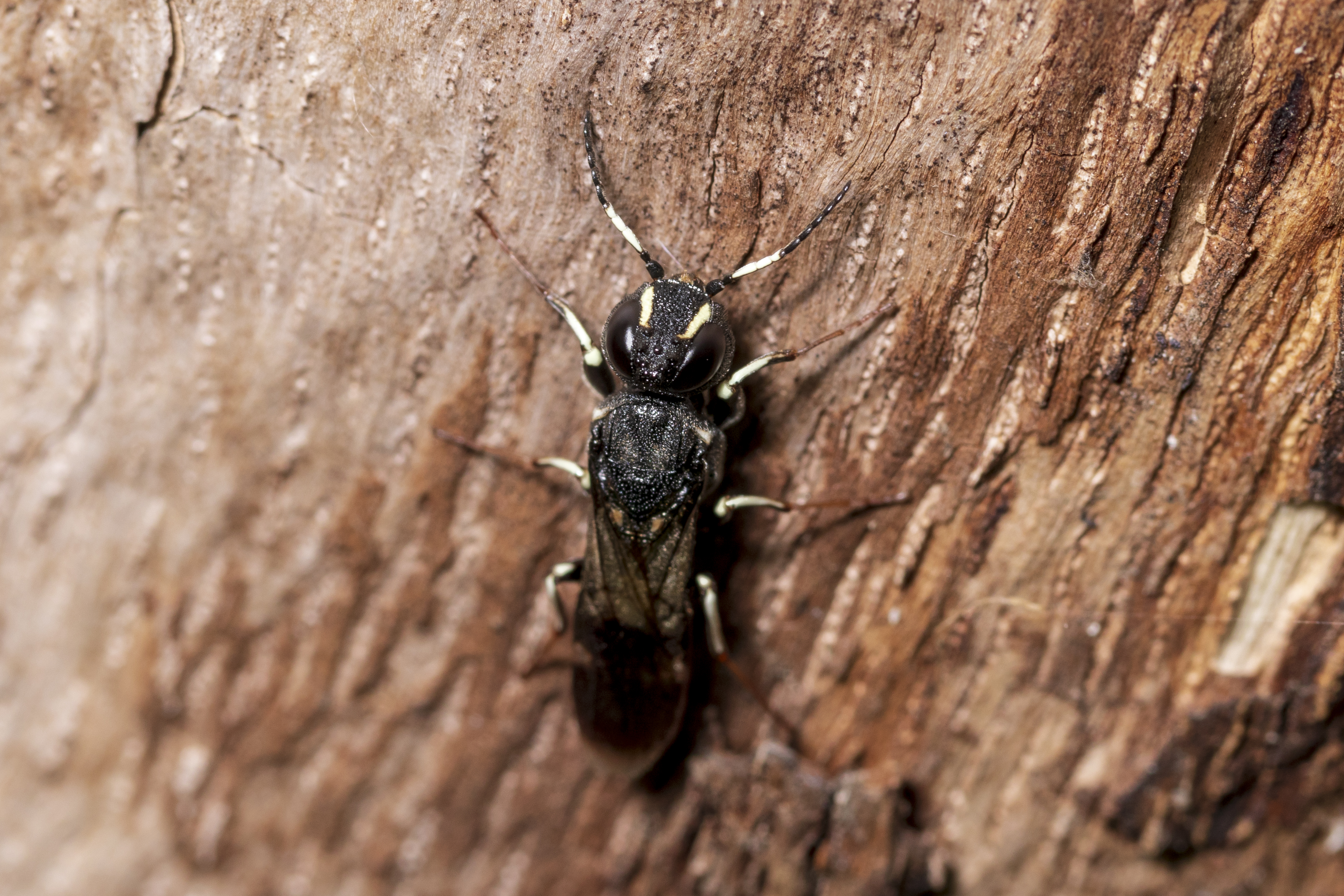
Orussus abietinus; Narew river near Pułtusk, Poland

The Orussidae or the parasitic wood wasps represent a small family of sawflies ("Symphyta"). Currently, about 93 extant and four fossil species are known. They take a key position in phylogenetic analyses of Hymenoptera, because they form the sister taxon of the megadiverse apocritan wasps, and the common ancestor of Orussidae + Apocrita evolved parasitism for the first time in course of the evolution of the Hymenoptera. They are also the only sawflies with carnivorous larvae.

== Description ==
=== Adults ===
The fully winged sawflies are 2−23 mm long. They are predominantly black but species of Chalinus, Mocsarya and Orussobaius are more or less metallic. Some species have a red thorax or abdomen and conspicuous white or golden pilosity. Many Orussus species bear white spots on the legs. The antennae of males are composed of 11, those of females of 10 articles. The modified distal antennal articles of females (article 9 enlarged, article 10 very small) are involved in vibrational sounding to detect suitable oviposition sites and the host larvae living concealed inside wood. Contrary to other "Symphyta", the antennae insert near the lower edge of the compound eyes and close to the mandible. The mandibles are orthognathous and lack evident teeth. The number of palpomeres of the maxilla and the labium varies and is used as a taxonomic character. On the wings, some cross-veins are reduced in comparison with the more complete venation of other basal Hymenoptera. Similar as in most other sawflies, the wings are held at rest with a device called "cenchri". The complete body is strongly sclerotized and bears a species-specific microstructure, which is relevant for species identification. The ovipositor is several times as long as the body, and at rest it extends inside the body from the abdomen to the prothorax, where it is coiled, and back towards the tip of the abdomen again.

Orussidae and Stephanidae are the sole Hymenoptera in which the head bears a corona of erect teeth around the frontal ocelli. Contrary to Orussidae, the Stephanidae lack cenchri, and their mesosoma and metasoma are separated by a wasp waist, which is absent in Orussidae.

=== Larvae ===
Similar to the larvae of apocritan Hymenoptera, larvae of Orussidae have reduced some morphological features as a result of their parasitic life style inside the tunnels of wood-boring insects. They are white, subcylindrical, weakly sclerotized with a distinct head capsule. The mouthparts are hypognathous. Eyes and legs are reduced or completely absent. The mandibles are well developed and strongly sclerotized. Palps of maxilla and labium lack. The surface of the body is subdivided into distinct segments, each bearing a transverse row of 8−10 backward pointing spines.

== Biology and behavior ==
Orussid sawflies have been collected only rarely. Over the years, their abundance has been subject to strong fluctuations. The species are thermophilous and wasps are active during the hottest hours of the day. Therefore, they are rarely found by the entomologists specialized in sawflies.

Only for few species the larval biology is known. Orussidae are parasitoids of xylobiontic larvae of beetles or Hymenoptera, particularly of the larvae of jewel beetles (Buprestidae), long-horned beetles (Cerambycidae), and wood wasps (Siricidae, Xiphydriidae). Orussids can be observed running around quickly on dead tree trunks. The females locate the host larvae living concealed inside wood by generating vibrations by tapping the tips of their antennae against the wood surface. The vibrations are picked up by the modified fore legs. After locating the host, the female drills into the wood with the very long ovipositor and lays the egg. The egg is very elongate with a small expansion on the anterior end and a long expansion on the posterior end. The egg is coiled on the host. In some species the egg is possibly laid into the tunnel of the host if the host itself can not be reached, and the orussid larva itself crawls to the host. On its way to the host it may gnaw through the wood shavings left by the host. It has been disputed whether this material contributes to the nutrition of the larva. At least in Guiglia schauinslandi, the larva lives externally for its first two instars and then enters the inside of the dead host, where it remains until the adult emerges.

== Systematics ==
Numerous morphological and genetic studies indicate that the Orussidae form the sister taxon of the Apocrita, the wasps, bees, and ants. Accordingly, parasitic life style has not evolved first in Apocrita but in the common ancestor of Orussidae + Apocrita.

Earlier, the Orussidae were sometimes put into a separate suborder, Idiogastra, but today they are classified in their own superfamily, Orussoidea. Orussidae are demonstrably monophyletic. Tribes and subfamilies within the Orussidae have been abandoned, since such earlier subdivisions could not be corroborated in phylogenetic analyses.

The cladogram is based on Schulmeister 2003. The Orussoidea are sister to the Apocrita.

- Hymenoptera, 250mya
  - Xyeloidea (Triassic-present)
  - - Tenthredinoidea
    - - Pamphilioidea
      - - Cephoidea (stem sawflies)
        - - Siricoidea (horntails or wood wasps)
          - - Xiphydrioidea (wood wasps)
            - parasitism
              - Orussoidea (parasitic wood wasps)
              - wasp waist 200mya
                Apocrita (ants, bees, wasps)

== Orussidae genera and species of the World ==
An identification key for the genera of the World was published by Vilhemsen (2003). The following list summarizes the genera and species and their gross distribution together with indications on identification keys:

- Argentophrynopus Vilhelmsen & D.R. Smith, 2002: 2 species, Costa Rica and supposedly Mexico. Taxonomy: Vilhelmsen & Smith (2002).
- †Baltorussus Schedl, 2011: 1 fossil species, Baltorussus velteni Schedl, 2011 from Baltic amber. Taxonomy: Schedl (2011).
- Chalinus Konow, 1897: 9 Afrotropic species. Taxonomy: Vilhelmsen (2001), Vilhelmsen (2005).
- Guiglia Benson, 1938: 7 Australian species as well as Guiglia schauinslandi (Ashmead, 1903) in New Zealand and Guiglia chiliensis Benson, 1955 in Chile. Taxonomy: Vilhelmsen & Smith (2002).
- Kulcania Benson, 1935: 2 species in Colombia, Costa Rica, Mexico and the USA. Taxonomy: Vilhelmsen & Smith (2002).
- Leptorussus Benson, 1955: 2 Afrotropic species. Taxonomy: Vilhelmsen (2003), Vilhelmsen (2007).
- †Mesorussus Rasnitsyn, 1977: 1 fossil species, Mesorussus taimyrensis Rasnitsyn, 1977. Taxonomy: Rasnitsyn (1977).
- †Minyorussus Basibuyuk, Quicke & Rasnitsyn, 2000: 1 fossil species, Minyorussus luzzii Basibuyuk, Quicke & Rasnitsyn, 2000. Taxonomy: Basibuyuk et al. (2000).
- Mocsarya Konow, 1897: 2 species, Mocsarya metallica (Mocsáry, 1896) in Indonesia and Sri Lanka, Mocsarya syriaca Benson, 1936 in Greece and Turkey (not in Syria!). Taxonomy: Vilhelmsen (2001).,
- Ophrella Middlekauff, 1985: 3 species, O. amazonica (Westwood, 1874) in French Guiana, Brazil and Panama, O. eldorado Vilhelmsen, 2013 and O. seagi Vilhelmsen 2016 in French Guiana. Taxonomy: Vilhelmsen & Smith (2002), Vilhelmsen et al. (2013), Vilhelmsen (2016).
- Ophrynon Middlekauff, 1983: 4 species in California (USA). Taxonomy: Vilhelmsen & Smith (2002), Blank et al. (2010).
- Ophrynopus Konow, 1897 (synonym: Stirocorsia Konow, 1897): 17 species in Japan, Indonesia, Laos, Malaysia, Philippines, Papua New Guinea and in the Neotropic realm. Taxonomy: Vilhelmsen & Smith (2002), Vilhelmsen et al. (2013).
- Orussella Benson, 1935: 1 species, Orussella dentifrons (Philippi, 1783), in Chile. Taxonomy: Vilhelmsen (2003).
- Orussobaius Benson, 1938: 9 species in Australia, Papua New Guinea and the Tanimbar Islands. Taxonomy: Schmidt & Vilhelmsen (2002)., Blank & Vilhelmsen (2016)
- Orussonia Riek, 1955: 2 species in Australia. Taxonomy: Schmidt & Gibson (2001).
- Orussus Latreille, 1797: 29 species in the Holarctic and Oriental realms. Taxonomy: Vilhemsen (2003, species of the World), Blank et al. (2006, O. abietinus and O. smithi), Vilhelmsen et al. (2013, species of the World).
- Pedicrista Benson, 1935: 1 species, Pedicrista hyalina Benson, 1935, in Malawi, South Africa and Zimbabwe. Taxonomy: Vilhelmsen (2003).
- Pseudoryssus Guiglia, 1954: 2 species in the West Palaearctic. Taxonomy: Kraus (1998), Blank et al. (2006).

== Orussidae of the United States, Canada and Great Britain ==
Twelve species of Orussidae are distributed in the United States and in Canada:

- Kulcania mexicana (Cresson, 1879) (Florida), K. tomentosa (Middlekauff) (Arizona, California). Taxonomy: Vilhelmsen & Smith (2002).
- Ophrynon dominiqueae Blank, Vilhelmsen & D.R. Smith, 2010, O. levigatus Middlekauff, 1983, O. martini Blank, Vilhelmsen & D.R. Smith, 2010, O. patricki Blank, Vilhelmsen & D.R. Smith, 2010, all distributed in California. Taxonomy: Blank et al. (2010).
- Ophrynopus nigricans (Cameron, 1883) in Texas. Taxonomy: Middlekauff (1983) (citing the species as Ophrynella nigricans), Vilhelmsen & Smith (2002).
- Orussus minutus Middlekauff, 1983 (eastern USA), O. occidentalis Cresson, 1879 (western USA, in Canada from southern British Columbia eastward to Ottawa, Ontario), O. sayii Westwood, 1835 (eastern USA and Canada), O. terminalis Newman, 1838 (eastern USA and Canada), O. thoracicus Ashmead, 1898 (western USA). Taxonomy: Middlekauff (1983), Vilhelmsen et al. (2013).

In Great Britain, Orussus abietinus (Scopoli, 1763) was recorded by Stephens (1835) upon two specimens caught by William Elford Leach in Darenth Wood and Devonshire around 1817. Morice (1904) recorded a more recent specimen taken at Hastings about 1880, but after re-examination this turned out to be Xiphydria prolongata (Geoffroy, 1785) (Xiphydriidae). Benson (1951) supposed O. abietinus "to have occurred in Britain in former times."

== Fossils ==
The oldest members of Orussoidea, the group containing Orussidae and its close relatives, are known from the Middle Jurassic Karabastau Formation of Kazakhstan. The oldest known members of modern Orussidae are from the Late Cretaceous. Ophrynopus peritus Engel, 2008 was described from Dominican Amber, Baltorussus velteni Schedl, 2011 from Baltic Amber, Mesorussus taimyrensis Rasnitsyn, 1977 from the Late Cretaceous of Taimyr, Siberia und Minyorussus luzzii Basibuyuk, Quicke & Rasnitsyn, 2000 from the Late Cretaceous of New Jersey.
