= Trichosteresis =

Scientific classification
- Kingdom: Animalia
- Phylum: Arthropoda
- Class: Insecta
- Order: Hymenoptera
- Family: Megaspilidae
- Subfamily: Megaspilinae
- Genus: Trichosteresis; Förster, 1856

Genus of wasps

Trichosteresis is a genus of Megaspilid wasps in the family Megaspilidae. There are at least three described species in Trichosteresis.

== Species ==
These three species belong to the genus Trichosteresis:

- Trichosteresis floridanus Ashmead
- Trichosteresis glabra (Boheman, 1832)
- Trichosteresis nudipennis Kieffer, 1907
