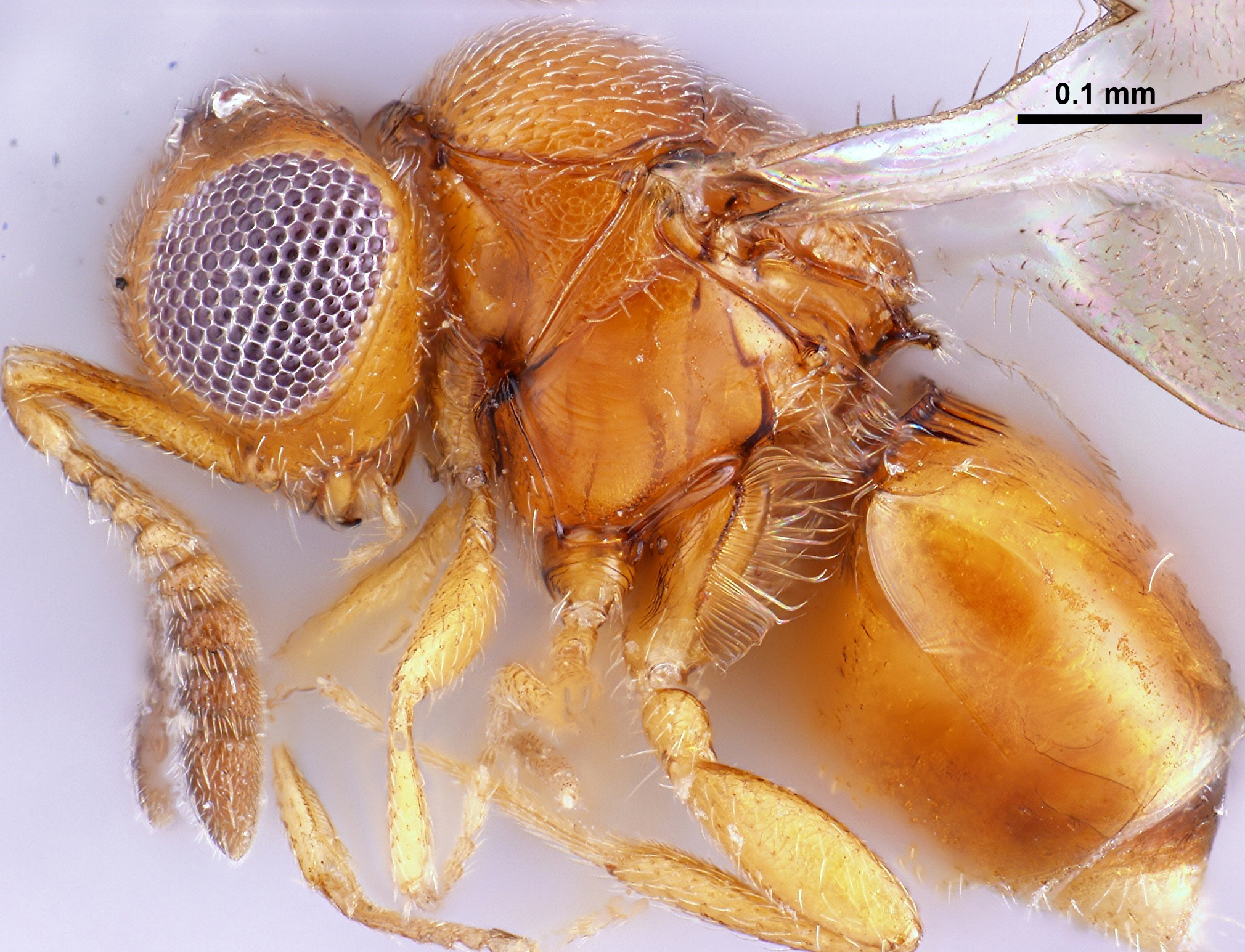
- Aphanogmus

Scientific classification
- Kingdom: Animalia
- Phylum: Arthropoda
- Clade: Pancrustacea
- Class: Insecta
- Order: Hymenoptera
- Family: Ceraphronidae
- Genus: Aphanogmus; Thomson, 1858

Diversity
- at least 90 species

= Aphanogmus =

Genus of wasps

Aphanogmus is a genus of wasps in the family Ceraphronidae that was erected by Carl Gustaf Thomson in 1858. Belgian entomologist Paul Dessart worked on the genus in the 1970's. They are primarily parasitoids of Ichneumonoidea and Cecidomyiidae, although one is a known parasite of Ochrotrichia moselyi, a caddisfly.

At least 90 species belong to the genus:

- Aphanogmus abdominalis Thomson 1858
- Aphanogmus albicoxalis Evans & Dessart 2004
- Aphanogmus amoratus Dessart & Alekseev 1982
- Aphanogmus angustipennis Szelenyi 1940
- Aphanogmus aphidi Risbec 1955
- Aphanogmus apicalis Szelenyi 1938
- Aphanogmus apteryx Szelenyi 1940
- Aphanogmus asper Szelenyi 1940
- Aphanogmus assimilis Dodd 1914
- Aphanogmus bicolor Ashmead 1893
- Aphanogmus brunneus Dodd 1914
- Aphanogmus canadensis Whittaker 1930
- Aphanogmus captiosus Polaszek & Dessart 1996
- Aphanogmus clavatellus Szelenyi 1938
- Aphanogmus claviartus Alekseev 1983
- Aphanogmus clavicornis Thomson 1858
- Aphanogmus compressiventris Foerster 1861
- Aphanogmus compressus Ratzeburg 1852
- Aphanogmus conicus Dessart 1975
- Aphanogmus crassiceps Kieffer 1907
- Aphanogmus dessarti Hellen 1966
- Aphanogmus dictynna Waterston 1923
- Aphanogmus dolichocerus Hellen & Dessart 1965
- Aphanogmus dorsalis Whittaker 1930
- Aphanogmus elegantulus Foerster 1861
- Aphanogmus eurymerus Foerster 1861
- Aphanogmus fasciipennis Thomson 1858
- Aphanogmus fasciolatus Foerster 1861
- Aphanogmus fijiensis Ferriere 1933
- Aphanogmus flavigastris Matsuo 2016
- Aphanogmus floridanus Ashmead 1893
- Aphanogmus fulmeki Szelenyi 1940
- Aphanogmus fumipennis Thomson 1858
- Aphanogmus furcatus Kieffer 1907
- Aphanogmus gibbus Szelenyi 1938
- Aphanogmus goniozi Dessart 1988
- Aphanogmus gracilicornis Foerster 1861
- Aphanogmus granulosus Dessart 1975
- Aphanogmus guadalcanalensis Buhl 1998
- Aphanogmus hakgalae Dessart 1975
- Aphanogmus hakonensis Ashmead 1904
- Aphanogmus harringtoni Muesebeck 1979
- Aphanogmus inamicus Evans & Dessart 2004
- Aphanogmus incredibilis Dessart 1978
- Aphanogmus insularis Ashmead 1896
- Aphanogmus javensis Girault 1917
- Aphanogmus kretschmanni Moser 2023
- Aphanogmus lamellifer Dessart 1994
- Aphanogmus limbocellatus Dessart 1980
- Aphanogmus longiclavus Dessart 1975
- Aphanogmus manihoti Dessart 1989
- Aphanogmus manilae Ashmead 1904
- Aphanogmus marylandicus Ashmead 1893
- Aphanogmus megacephalus Risbec 1958
- Aphanogmus microcleptes Foerster 1861
- Aphanogmus microneurus Kieffer 1907
- Aphanogmus monilicornis Kieffer 1907
- Aphanogmus myrmecobius Kieffer 1914
- Aphanogmus nanus Nees von Esenbeck 1834
- Aphanogmus neglectus Szelenyi 1938
- Aphanogmus niger Ashmead 1893
- Aphanogmus nigripes Dodd 1914
- Aphanogmus origenus Kieffer 1913
- Aphanogmus pallidipes Ashmead 1893
- Aphanogmus parvulus Roberti 1954
- Aphanogmus perfoliatus Nees von Esenbeck 1834
- Aphanogmus picicornis Foerster 1861
- Aphanogmus pidurutalagalae Dessart 1975
- Aphanogmus polymorphus Hellen & Dessart 1965
- Aphanogmus procerus Szelenyi 1940
- Aphanogmus radialis Kieffer 1907
- Aphanogmus remotus Szelenyi 1940
- Aphanogmus reticulatus Fouts 1934
- Aphanogmus rufus Szelenyi 1938
- Aphanogmus salicicola Ashmead 1893
- Aphanogmus serrulatus Meunier 1917
- Aphanogmus sigras Dessart 1981
- Aphanogmus socius Foerster 1861
- Aphanogmus steinitzi Priesner 1936
- Aphanogmus strabus Dessart 1994
- Aphanogmus strobilorum Bakke 1953
- Aphanogmus subapterus Whittaker 1930
- Aphanogmus tenuicornis Thomson 1858
- Aphanogmus terminalis Foerster 1861
- Aphanogmus thomasinianae Alekseev & Dolgin 1984
- Aphanogmus thylax Polaszek & Dessart 1996
- Aphanogmus triozae Dessart 1978
- Aphanogmus trispinosus Szelenyi 1940
- Aphanogmus unifasciatus Dodd 1914
- Aphanogmus varipes Ashmead 1893
- Aphanogmus vernoniae Risbec 1953
- Aphanogmus vicinus Foerster 1861
- Aphanogmus virginiensis Ashmead 1893
- Aphanogmus vitripennis Ratzeburg 1852
- Aphanogmus zefranki Salden, Mikó & Peters
