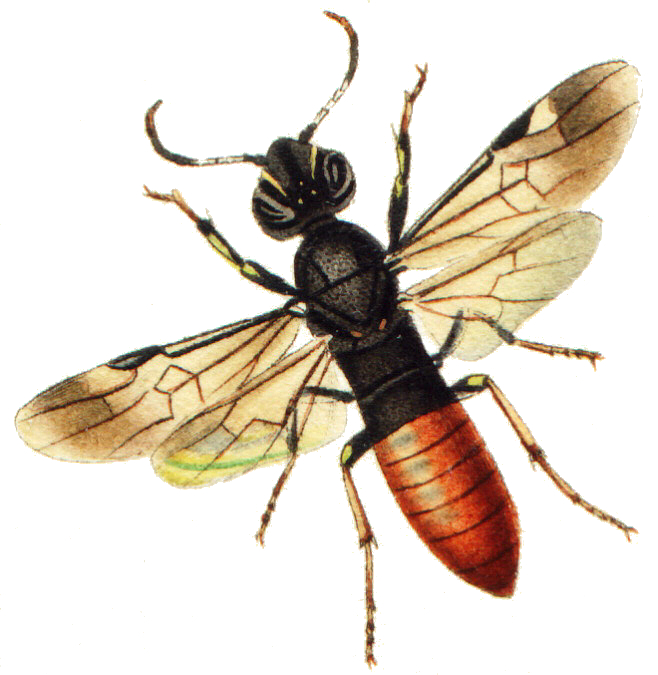
- Orussus abietinus

Scientific classification
- Kingdom: Animalia
- Phylum: Arthropoda
- Clade: Pancrustacea
- Class: Insecta
- Order: Hymenoptera
- Family: Orussidae
- Genus: Orussus; Latreille, 1796

Type species
- Orussus abietinus

Synonyms
- Oryssus Latreille, 1798 (Emend.); Heliorussus Benson 1955

= Orussus =

Genus of sawflies

Orussus is a genus of parasitic wood wasps in the family Orussidae. There are about 30 described species in Orussus.

== Species ==
- Orussus abietinus (Scopoli, 1763)
- Orussus afer Guiglia, 1937
- Orussus areolatus Blank & Vilhelmsen, 2014
- Orussus bensoni Guiglia, 1937
- Orussus boninensis Yasumatsu, 1954
- Orussus brunneus Shinohara & Smith, 1983
- Orussus coreanus Takeuchi, 1938
- Orussus decoomani Maa, 1950
- Orussus hanumanus Vilhelmsen & Blank, 2014
- Orussus japonicus Tosawa, 1930
- Orussus loriae Mantero, 1899
- Orussus melanosoma Lee & Wei, 2014
- Orussus minutus Middlekauff, 1983
- Orussus moroi Guiglia, 1954
- Orussus occidentalis Cresson, 1879
- Orussus punctulatissimus Blank & Vilhelmsen, 2014
- Orussus rufipes Tsuneki, 1963
- Orussus sayii Westwood, 1835
- Orussus schoutedeni Guiglia, 1937
- Orussus scutator (Benson, 1955)
- Orussus smithi Blank, Kraus & Taeger, 2006
- Orussus spinifer (Benson, 1955)
- Orussus striatus Maa, 1950
- Orussus taorminensis Trautmann, 1922
- Orussus terminalis Newman, 1838
- Orussus tessmanni Enslin, 1913
- Orussus thoracicus Ashmead, 1898
- Orussus unicolor Latreille, 1812
- Orussus zhui Vilhelmsen, Liu, Smith & Blank, 2014
