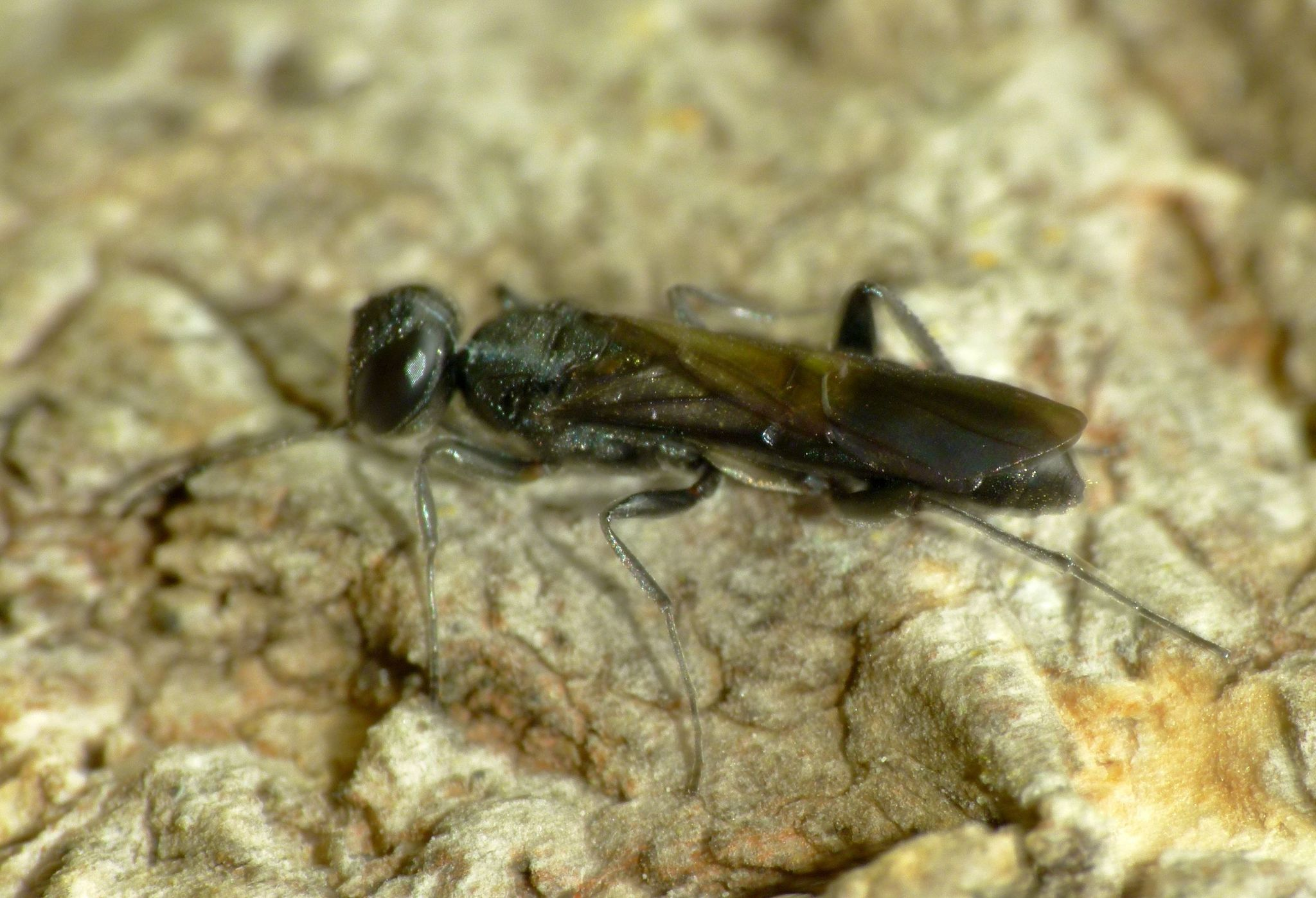
- Guiglia schauinslandi

Scientific classification
- Kingdom: Animalia
- Phylum: Arthropoda
- Clade: Pancrustacea
- Class: Insecta
- Order: Hymenoptera
- Family: Orussidae
- Genus: Guiglia; Benson, 1938

Type species
- Guiglia bombycinis

Species
- Guiglia bombycinis Guigliu chiliensis Guiglia rubicunda Guiglia schauinslandi

= Guiglia (sawfly) =

Genus of sawflies

Guiglia is a genus of parasitic wood wasps in the family Orussidae. It was first described by Robert B. Benson in 1938.

== Species ==
The following are some of the species recognised as being in the genus Guiglia:

- Guiglia bombycinis Benson, 1938
- Guigliu chiliensis Benson, 1955
- Guiglia rubicunda Schmidt, 2002
- Guiglia schauinslandi (Ashmead, 1903)
