= Megaspilus =

Scientific classification
- Kingdom: Animalia
- Phylum: Arthropoda
- Class: Insecta
- Order: Hymenoptera
- Family: Megaspilidae
- Genus: Megaspilus; Westwood, 1829

Genus of wasps

Megaspilus is a genus of wasp in the family Megaspilidae.

== Taxonomy ==
Megaspilus contains the following species:

- Megaspilus armatus (Say, 1836)
- Megaspilus dux (Curtis, 1829)
- Megaspilus striolatus (Thomson, 1858)
