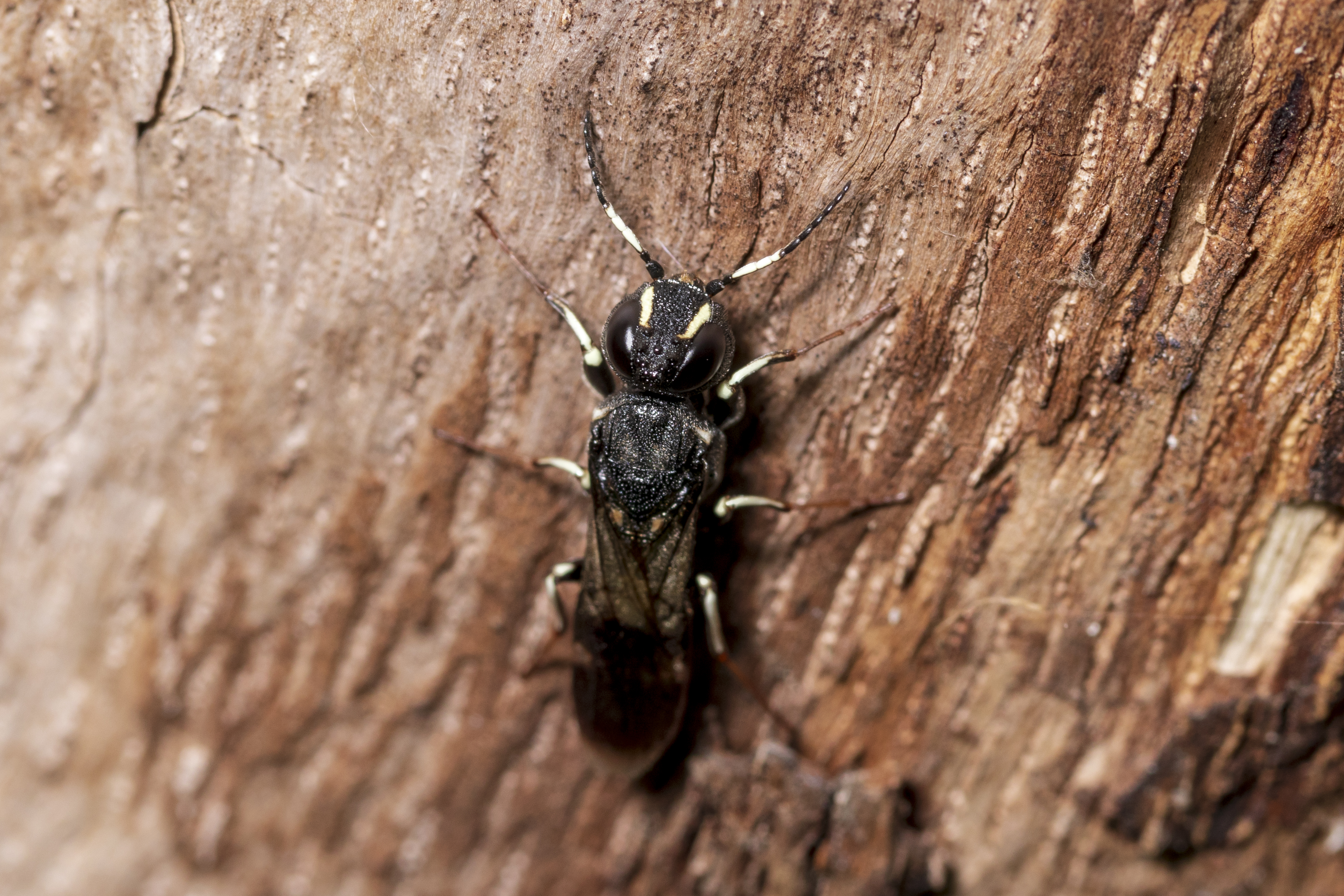
- Orussus abietinus (Orussidae)

Scientific classification
- Kingdom: Animalia
- Phylum: Arthropoda
- Clade: Pancrustacea
- Class: Insecta
- Order: Hymenoptera
- Clade: Unicalcarida
- Superfamily: Orussoidea; Newman, 1834

Families
- Orussidae; †Burmorussidae; †Paroryssidae

= Orussoidea =

Orussoidea Temporal range: Middle Jurassic–Present

Superfamily of sawflies

Orussoidea is a superfamily of sawflies. It contains the living family Orussidae, as well as the extinct families Burmorussidae and Paroryssidae. They are the group of sawflies closest to the Apocrita, the group containing wasps, bees and ants, with both groups together forming the clade Euhymenoptera. Like most members of Apocrita, but unlike other sawflies, members of the superfamily are parasitoids. The Family Orussidae is the Type Family of this Superfamily

== Taxonomy ==
- †Burmorussidae Qi Zhang, Dmitry S. Kopylov and A. P. Rasnitsyn, 2020 Burmese amber, Myanmar, Late Cretaceous (Cenomanian)
  - †Burmorussus Qi Zhang, Dmitry S. Kopylov and A. P. Rasnitsyn, 2020
  - †Cretorussus Jouault, Perrichot & Nel, 2021
- †Paroryssidae Martynov 1925
  - †Microryssus Rasnitsyn 1968 Karabastau Formation Kazakhstan, Middle-Late Jurassic (Callovian/Oxfordian)
  - †Paroryssus Martynov 1925 Karabastau Formation Kazakhstan, Middle-Late Jurassic (Callovian/Oxfordian)
  - †Praeoryssus Rasnitsyn 1968 Karabastau Formation Kazakhstan, Middle-Late Jurassic (Callovian/Oxfordian)
- Orussidae Newman, 1834 Late Cretaceous (Turonian)-Recent

Burmorussidae is the earliest diverging group, with the Paroryssidae more closely related to modern Orussidae. The infraorder Orussomorpha was proposed for the grouping of Orussoidea with Karatavitidae, however Karatavitidae is now considered to be more basal than the clade consisting of Orussoidea and Apocrita (Euhymenoptera)
