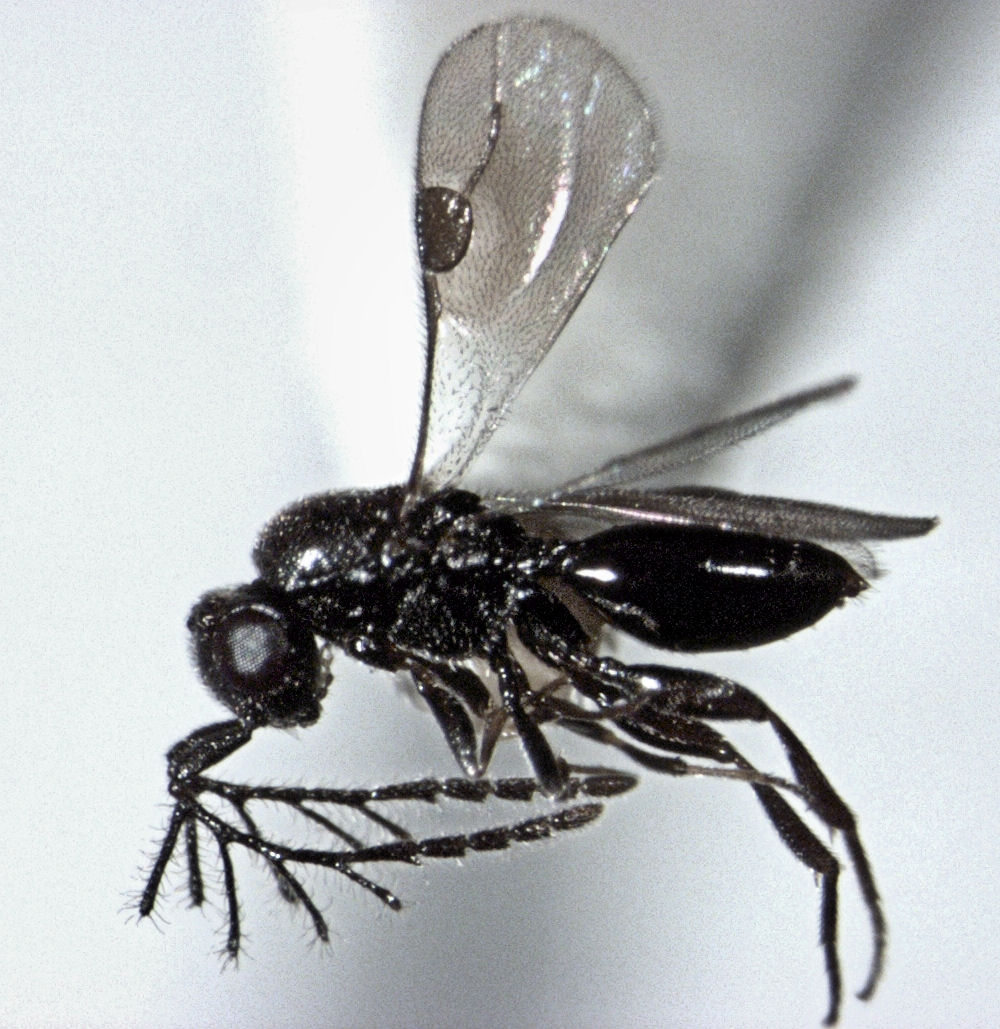

Scientific classification
- Kingdom: Animalia
- Phylum: Arthropoda
- Class: Insecta
- Order: Hymenoptera
- Family: Megaspilidae
- Subfamily: Megaspilinae
- Genus: Dendrocerus; Ratzeburg, 1852

Diversity
- at least 100 species

= Dendrocerus =

Genus of wasps

Dendrocerus is a large genus of ceraphronoid wasps in the family Megaspilidae. There are more than 100 described species in Dendrocerus.

== See also ==
- List of Dendrocerus species
