= Cenchrus (insect anatomy) =

The cenchrus (plural cenchri) is a specialized anatomical structure in the insect group known as sawflies. The cenchri are small blister-like lobes on the metanotum of these insects, just posterior to the mesothoracic scutellum, shaped and positioned in such a way as to latch onto the base of the front wings when they are folded at rest. There are corresponding small patches on the wings where the membrane is roughened, to increase the friction against the dorsal surface of the cenchri. This is a unique mechanism among the insects.
