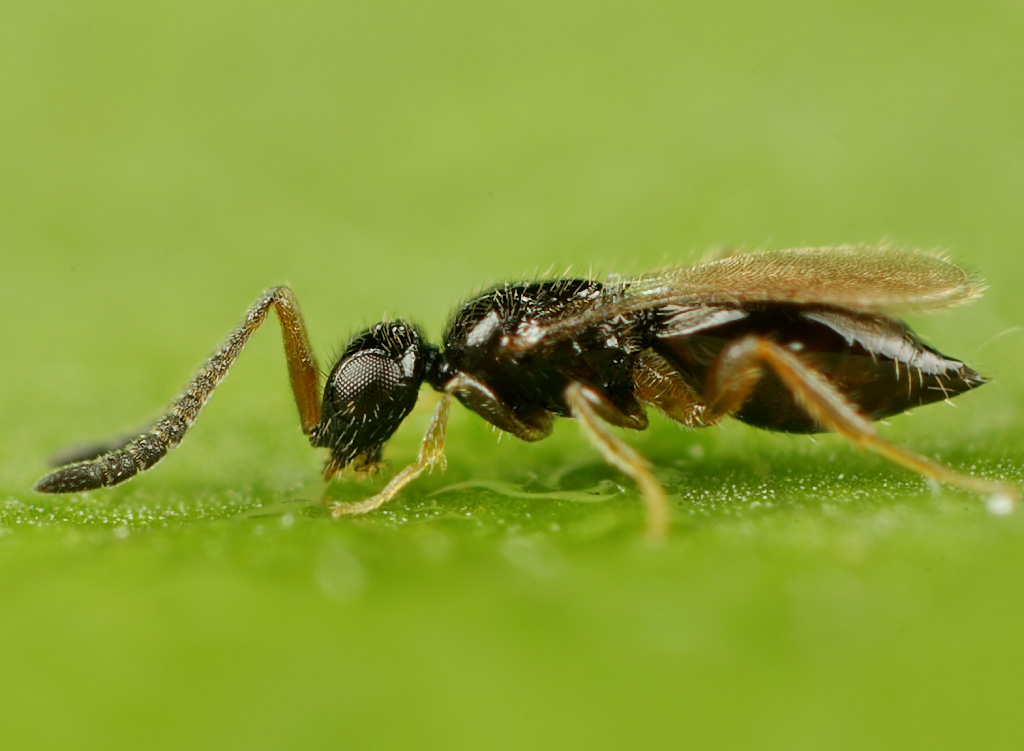
- Ceraphronidae. Lateral view.

Scientific classification
- Kingdom: Animalia
- Phylum: Arthropoda
- Clade: Pancrustacea
- Class: Insecta
- Order: Hymenoptera
- Superfamily: Ceraphronoidea
- Family: Ceraphronidae; Haliday, 1833

= Ceraphronidae =

Family of wasps

The Ceraphronidae, commonly known as ceraphronids or ceraphronid wasps, are a small hymenopteran family with 14 genera and some 360 known species, though a great many species are still undescribed. It is a poorly known group as a whole, though most are believed to be parasitoids (especially of flies), and a few hyperparasitoids. Many are found in the soil, and of these, a number are wingless.

The family is distinguished from the closely related Megaspilidae by having a very small stigma in the wing, a very broad metasomal petiole, and a single median groove in the mesoscutum.

The taxon was erected by Alexander Henry Haliday in 1833.

== Genera ==
This family contains the following genera:

- Abacoceraphron Dessart, 1975
- Aphanogmus Thomson, 1858
- Ceraphron Jurine, 1806
- Cyoceraphron Dessart, 1975
- Donadiola Dessart, 1975
- Ecitonetes Brues, 1902
- Elysoceraphron Szelenyi, 1936
- Gnathoceraphron Dessart & Bin, 1981
- Homaloceraphron Dessart & Masner, 1969
- Kenitoceraphron Dessart, 1975
- Microceraphron Szelenyi, 1935
- Pteroceraphron Dessart, 1981
- Retasus Dessart, 1984
- Synarsis Förster, 1878
