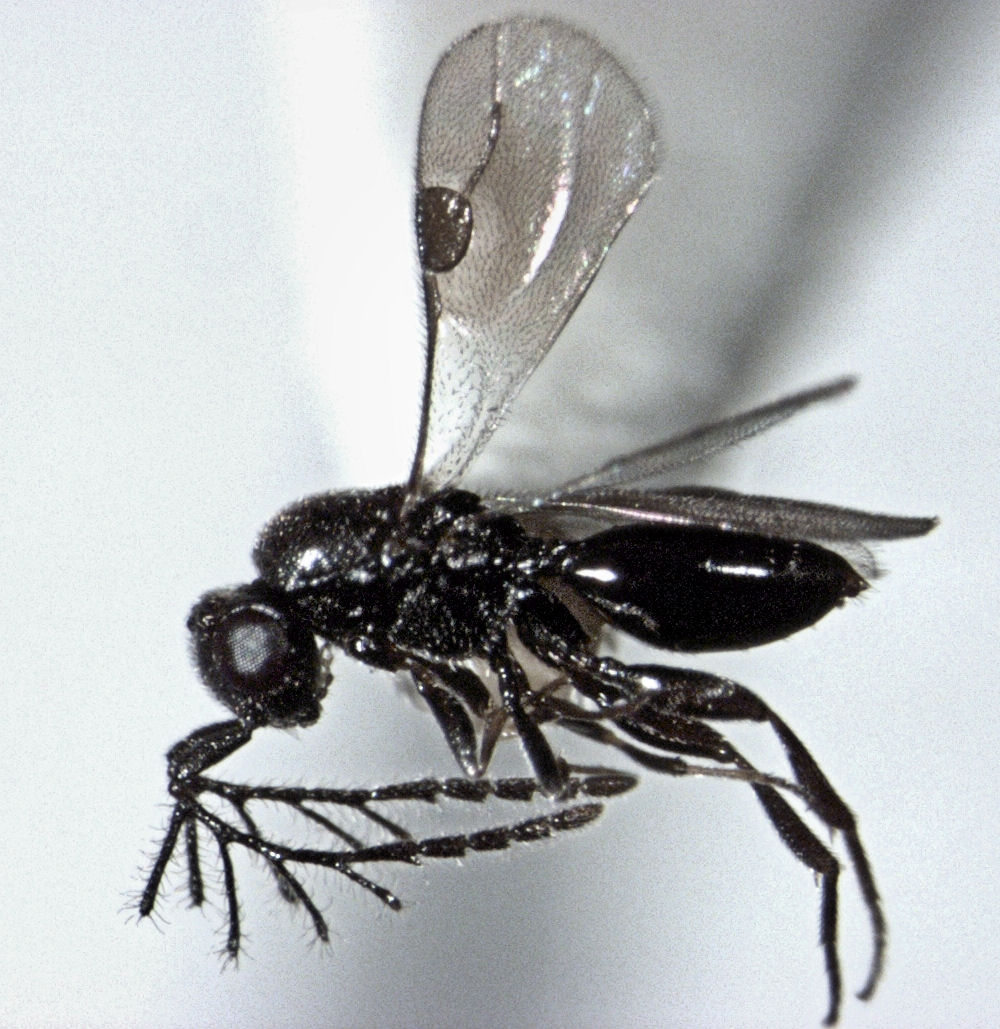
- Mounted specimen of a male Dendrocerus sp.

Scientific classification
- Kingdom: Animalia
- Phylum: Arthropoda
- Clade: Pancrustacea
- Class: Insecta
- Order: Hymenoptera
- Superfamily: Ceraphronoidea
- Family: Megaspilidae

= Megaspilidae =

Megaspilidae Temporal range: Early Cretaceous–Present

Family of wasps

The Megaspilidae are a small hymenopteran family with 13 genera in two subfamilies, and some 450 known species, with a great many species still undescribed. It is a poorly known group as a whole, though most are believed to be parasitoids (especially of sternorrhynchan Hemiptera), and a few hyperparasitoids. Many are found in the soil, and of these, a number are wingless.

The family is distinguished from the closely related Ceraphronidae by having a very large stigma in the wing, a relatively constricted metasomal petiole, and three grooves in the mesoscutum.

The largest genus within Megaspilidae is Dendrocerus. The second largest genus is Conostigmus.

== Genera ==
These 13 genera belong to the family Megaspilidae:

- Aetholagynodes Dessart, 1994
- Archisynarsis Szabó, 1973
- Conostigmus Dahlbom, 1858
- Creator Alekseev, 1980
- Dendrocerus Ratzeburg, 1852
- Holophleps Kozlov, 1966
- Lagynodes Förster, 1841
- Megaspilus Westwood, 1829
- Platyceraphron Kieffer, 1906
- Prolagynodes Alekseev & Rasnitsyn, 1981
- Trassedia Cancemi, 1996
- Trichosteresis Förster, 1856
- Typhlolagynodes Dessart, 1981

Additionally, the extinct genus Alphaspilus was described from Early Cretaceous Lebanese Amber.
