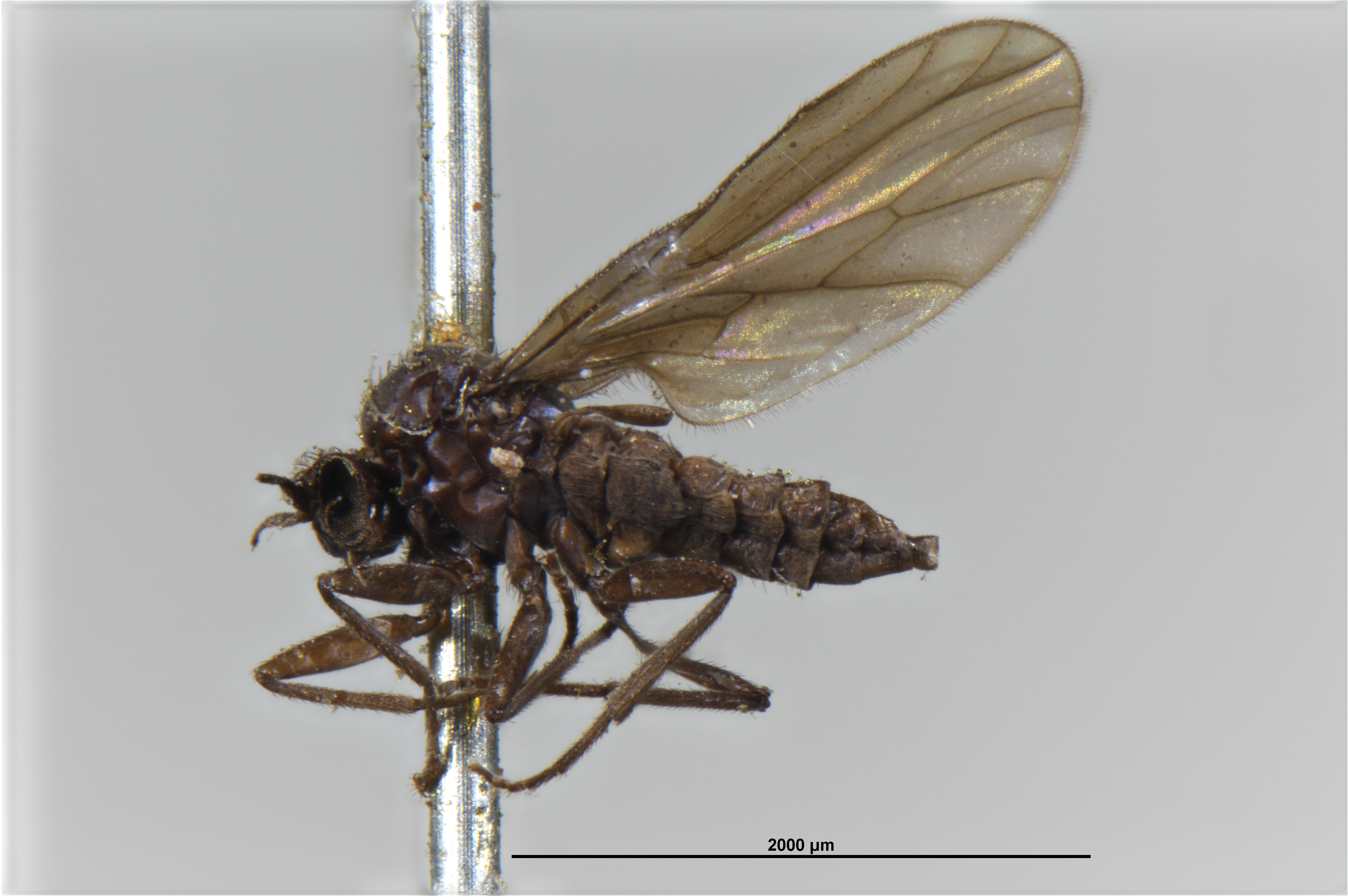
- Ragas unica

Scientific classification
- Kingdom: Animalia
- Phylum: Arthropoda
- Clade: Pancrustacea
- Class: Insecta
- Order: Diptera
- Suborder: Brachycera
- Infraorder: Asilomorpha
- Superfamily: Empidoidea
- Family: Ragadidae; Sinclair, 2016

Subfamilies
- Iteaphilinae; Ragadinae

= Ragadidae =

Family of true flies in the superfamily Empidoidea

Ragadidae is a family of true flies in the superfamily Empidoidea. It was formerly considered a lower taxon, but was published as a new subfamily within Empididae in 2016. Since then, it has been classified as the sister group to Empididae, and has been elevated to family level based on the genetic differences which separate it from Empididae.

== Description ==
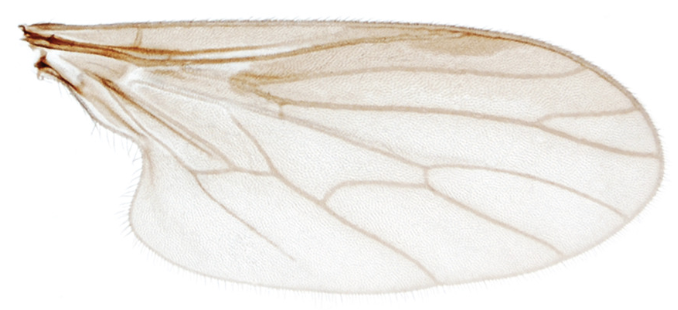
Photograph of right wing of a species within Ragadidae, Ragas unica

Ragadidae are similar to Empididae and Atelestidae in the sense that their genitalia have symmetrical and straight terminalia. In their wings, the point of origin of the R_{s} vein is located at a distance from the humeral crossvein (h) as long as, or longer than, h. There is also a circumambient costa in the wing, which distinguishes Ragadidae from Atelestidae. Furthermore, the prosternum being separated from the proepisternum sets Ragadidae aside from Empididae—this is true for all except one genera (Hydropeza spp.), which can instead be characterized through its recurved labrum. In Empididae, this labrum is straight.

== Systematics ==
Ragadidae consists of two subfamilies, Iteaphilinae and Ragadinae, in which 7 genera are included in total: Dipsomyia, Hormopeza, Hydropeza, Ragas, Zanclotus, Anthepiscopus and Iteaphila.

Based on the most recent phylogenetic studies, the relationship between Ragadidae and other members of Empidoidea is as follows. The placement of Ragadidae is emphasized in bold formatting.

- Atelestidae
  - - Atelestinae
    - Nemedininae
- - Hybotidae
    - Bicellariinae
    - - - - - - Hybotinae
              - Oedaleinae
            - Ocydromiinae
          - Trichininae
        - Tachydromiinae
          - - Tachydromiini
            - Symballaphthalmini
          - Drapetini
  - - Dolichopodidae
    - - **Ragadidae**
        - Iteaphilinae
        - Ragadinae
      - Empididae
        - Clinocerinae
        - - Brachystomatinae
            - Brachystomatini
            - Ceratomerini
            - Trichopezini
          - Empidinae
            - - Chelipodini
              - Empidini
            - - Hemerodromiini
              - Hilarini
