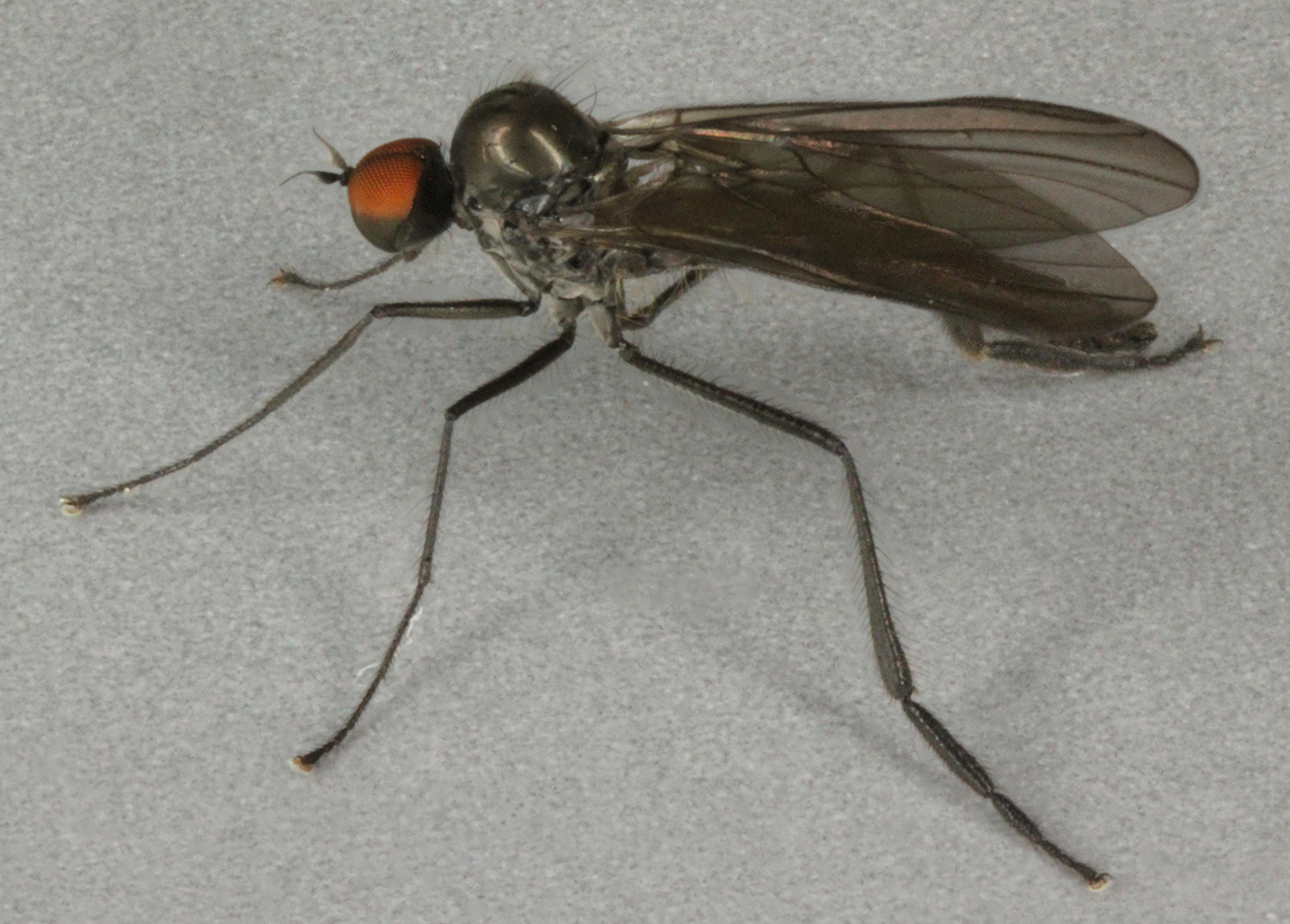
- Bicellaria nigra

Scientific classification
- Kingdom: Animalia
- Phylum: Arthropoda
- Class: Insecta
- Order: Diptera
- Family: Hybotidae
- Subfamily: Ocydromiinae
- Tribe: Bicellariini
- Genus: Bicellaria
- Species: B. nigra

Binomial name
- Bicellaria nigra (Meigen, 1824)

Synonyms
- Cyrtoma nigra Meigen, 1824

= Bicellaria nigra =

Species of fly

Bicellaria nigra is a species of fly in the family Hybotidae. It is found in the Palearctic.
