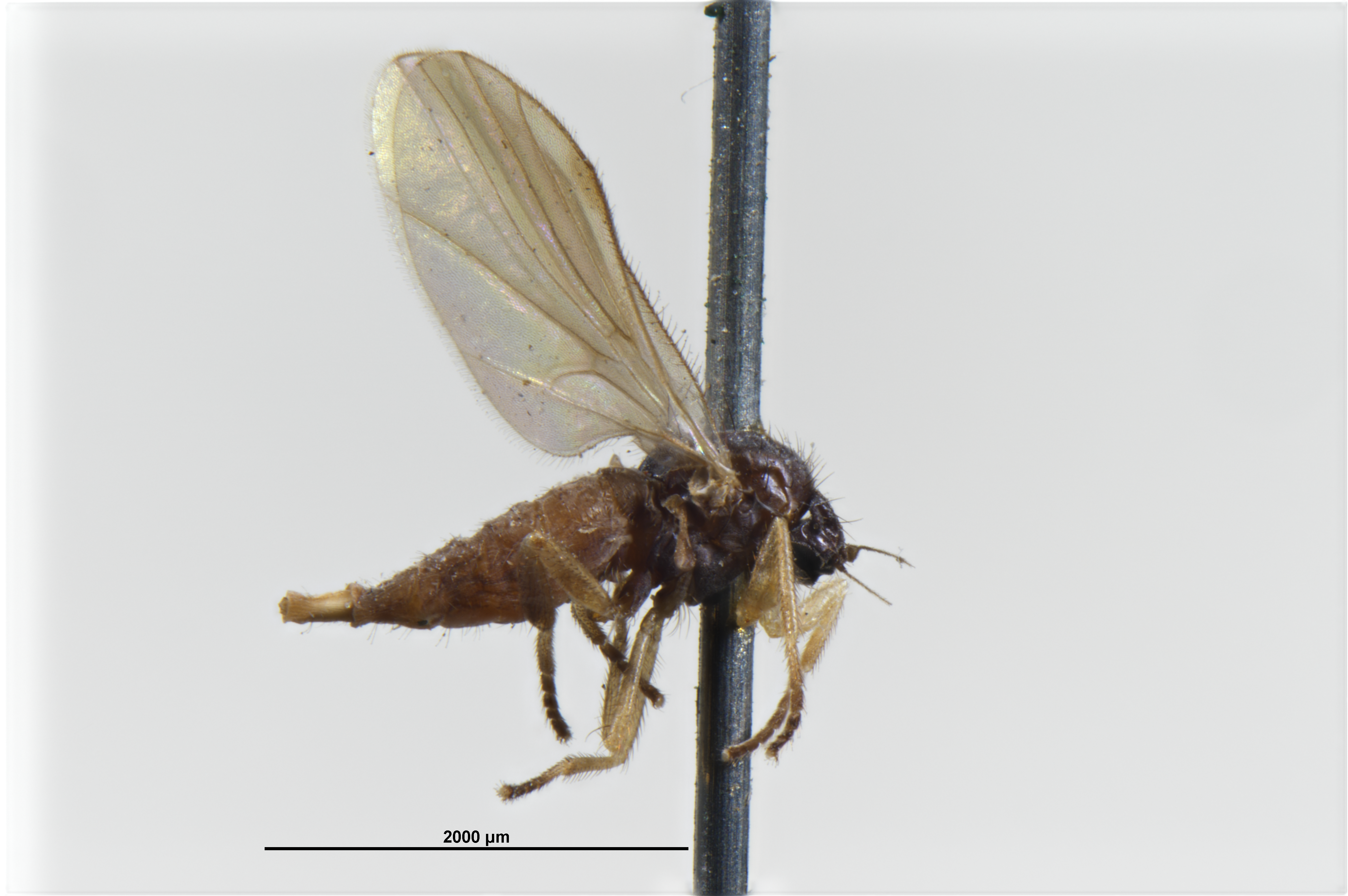
- Atelestus pulicarius

Scientific classification
- Kingdom: Animalia
- Phylum: Arthropoda
- Clade: Pancrustacea
- Class: Insecta
- Order: Diptera
- Superfamily: Empidoidea
- Family: Atelestidae; Hennig, 1970

Genera
- Acarteroptera; Alavesia Waters and Arillo 1999; Atelestus Walker, 1837; Meghyperus; Nemedina

= Atelestidae =

Atelestidae Temporal range: Berriasian–Recent

Family of flies

Atelestidae is a family of flies in the superfamily Empidoidea. The four genera were placed in a separate family in 1983; they were formerly either in Platypezidae (which are not even particularly closely related) or considered incertae sedis. While they are doubtless sister to all other living Empidoidea, the monophyly of the family is not fully proven. The genus Nemedina seems to represent a most ancient lineage among the entire superfamily, while Meghyperus is probably not monophyletic in its present delimitation, and it is liable to be split up eventually, with some species being placed elsewhere. In 2010, the genus Alavesia, previously only known from Cretaceous fossils, was found alive in Namibia, subsequent species were also described from Brazil.

Atelestidae has been shown to form the sister group to the remaining members of the Empidoidea superfamily. Subfamilies include Atelestinae and Nemedininae.

== Description ==
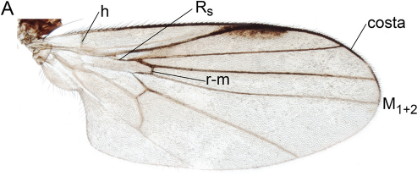
Right wing of Atelestus pulicarius, showing humeral crossvein (h), radial sector (R_{s}), costa and first and second medial vein (M_{1+2}).

Atelestidae are small (2–3 mm) greyish-dusted flies. They are quite similar to Empididae and Ragadidae as all three families have a symmetrical male terminalia without rotation, and the origin of vein R_{s} (radial sector) is at a distance from humeral crossvein (h) as long or longer than length of h. However, it is distinguished from Ragadidae by a costa ending at or near the first and second medial vein (M_{1+2}), and from Empididae by having the prosternum separated from proepisternum.

They have a disjunct distribution, being found in both the Holarctic and southern Neotropical regions (Chile).

== Systematics ==
Based on the most recent phylogenetic studies, the relationship between Atelestidae and other members of Empidoidea is as follows. The placement of Atelestidae is emphasized in bold formatting.

- **Atelestidae**
  - - Atelestinae
    - Nemedininae
- - Hybotidae
    - Bicellariinae
    - - - - - - Hybotinae
              - Oedaleinae
            - Ocydromiinae
          - Trichininae
        - Tachydromiinae
          - - Tachydromiini
            - Symballaphthalmini
          - Drapetini
  - - Dolichopodidae
    - - Ragadidae
        - Iteaphilinae
        - Ragadinae
      - Empididae
        - Clinocerinae
        - - Brachystomatinae
            - Brachystomatini
            - Ceratomerini
            - Trichopezini
          - Empidinae
            - - Chelipodini
              - Empidini
            - - Hemerodromiini
              - Hilarini

=== Genera ===
- Subfamily Atelestinae Hennig 1970
  - Acarteroptera Collin, 1933 Chile, Recent
  - Alavesia Waters & Arillo, 1999 Spanish amber, Albian, Burmese amber, Cenomanian Namibia, Brazil, Recent
  - †Atelestites Grimaldi & Cumming, 1999 Lebanese amber, Barremian
  - Atelestus Walker, 1837 Palearctic, Recent
  - †Dianafranksia Coram et al., 2000 Lulworth Formation, United Kingdom, Berriasian
  - †Kurnubempis Kaddumi, 2007 Jordanian amber, Albian
  - Meghyperus Loew, 1850 Palearctic, Nearctic, Recent
- Subfamily Nemedininae Sinclair & Cumming, 2006
  - †Cretodromia Grimaldi & Cumming, 1999 Canadian amber, Campanian
  - Nemedina Chandler, 1981 Baltic amber, Eocene, Palearctic, Recent
  - †Nemedromia Grimaldi & Cumming, 1999 New Jersey amber, Turonian Canadian amber, Campanian
  - †Neoturonius Grimaldi & Cumming, 1999 New Jersey amber, Turonian
  - †Phaetempis Grimaldi & Cumming, 1999 Lebanese amber, Barremian
  - †Prolatomyia Grimaldi & Cumming, 1999 Canadian amber, Campanian
