= Atelestus =

Atelestus may refer to:

- Atelestus (fly), a genus of flies in the family Atelestidae
- Atelestus, a genus of beetles in the family Malachiidae; synonym of Brachemys
