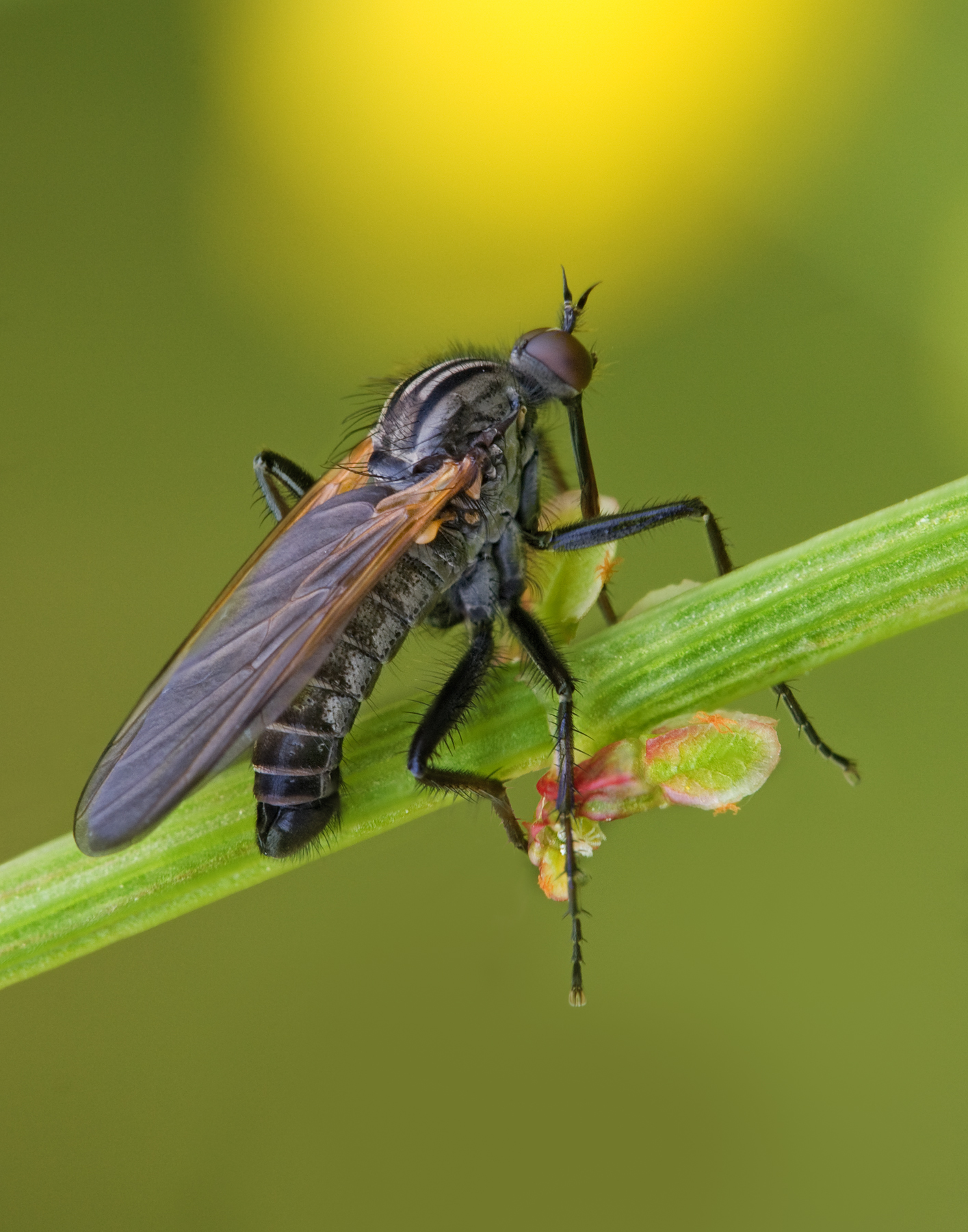
- Empis tessellata

Scientific classification
- Kingdom: Animalia
- Phylum: Arthropoda
- Clade: Pancrustacea
- Class: Insecta
- Order: Diptera
- Infraorder: Asilomorpha
- Superfamily: Empidoidea; Linnaeus, 1758

Families
- See text

= Empidoidea =

Superfamily of flies

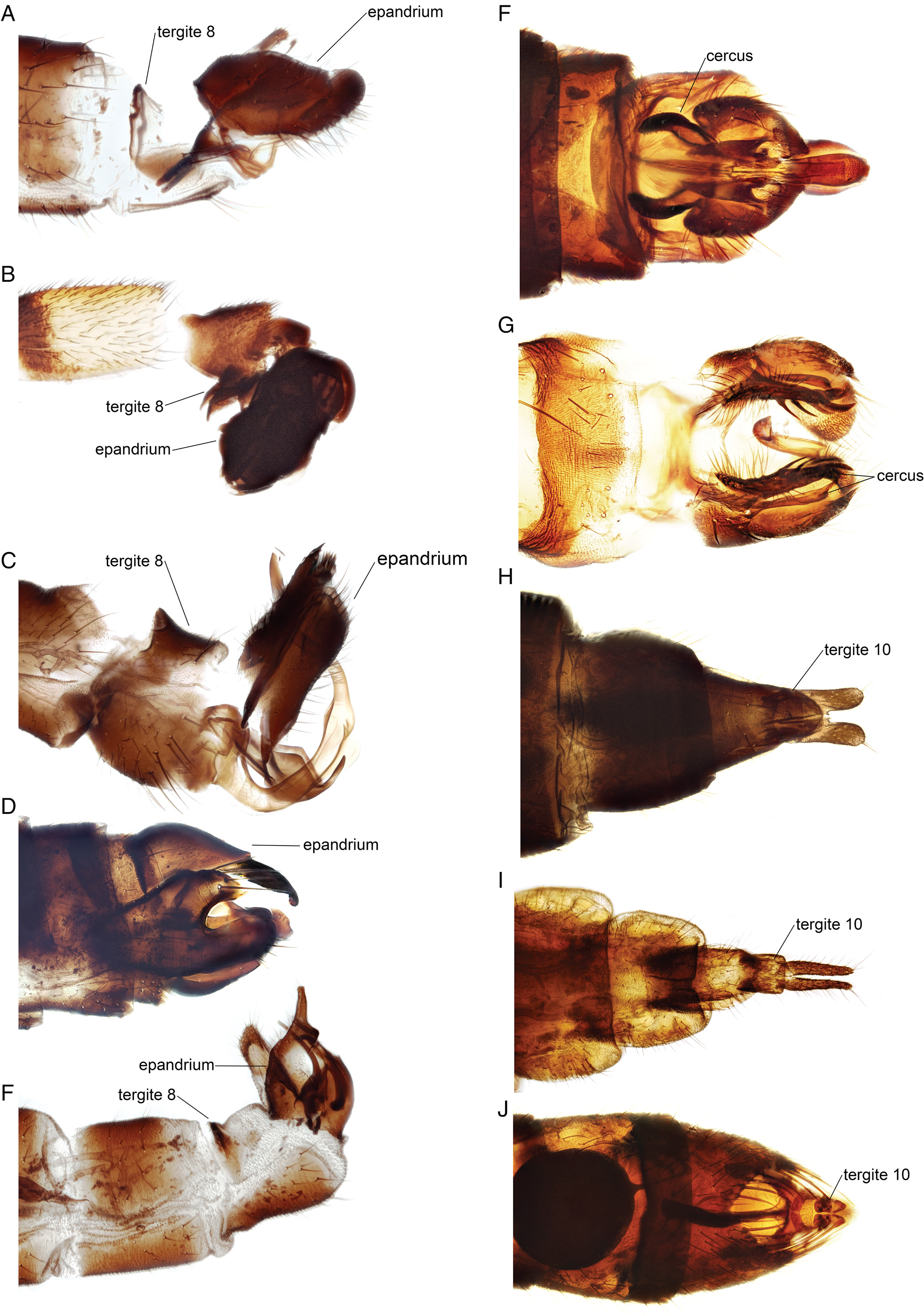
Pictures of posterior part of abdomen. (A–E) male genitalia in dorsal view, Atelestus pulicarius (A), Neurigona suturalis (B), Empis vitripennis (C), Hybos grossipes (D), Ragas unica (E); (F, G) male genitalia in dorsal view, Clinocera nivalis (F), E. vitripennis (G); (H–J), female genitalia in dorsal view, C. nivalis (H), E. vitripennis (I), Trichopeza longicornis (J).

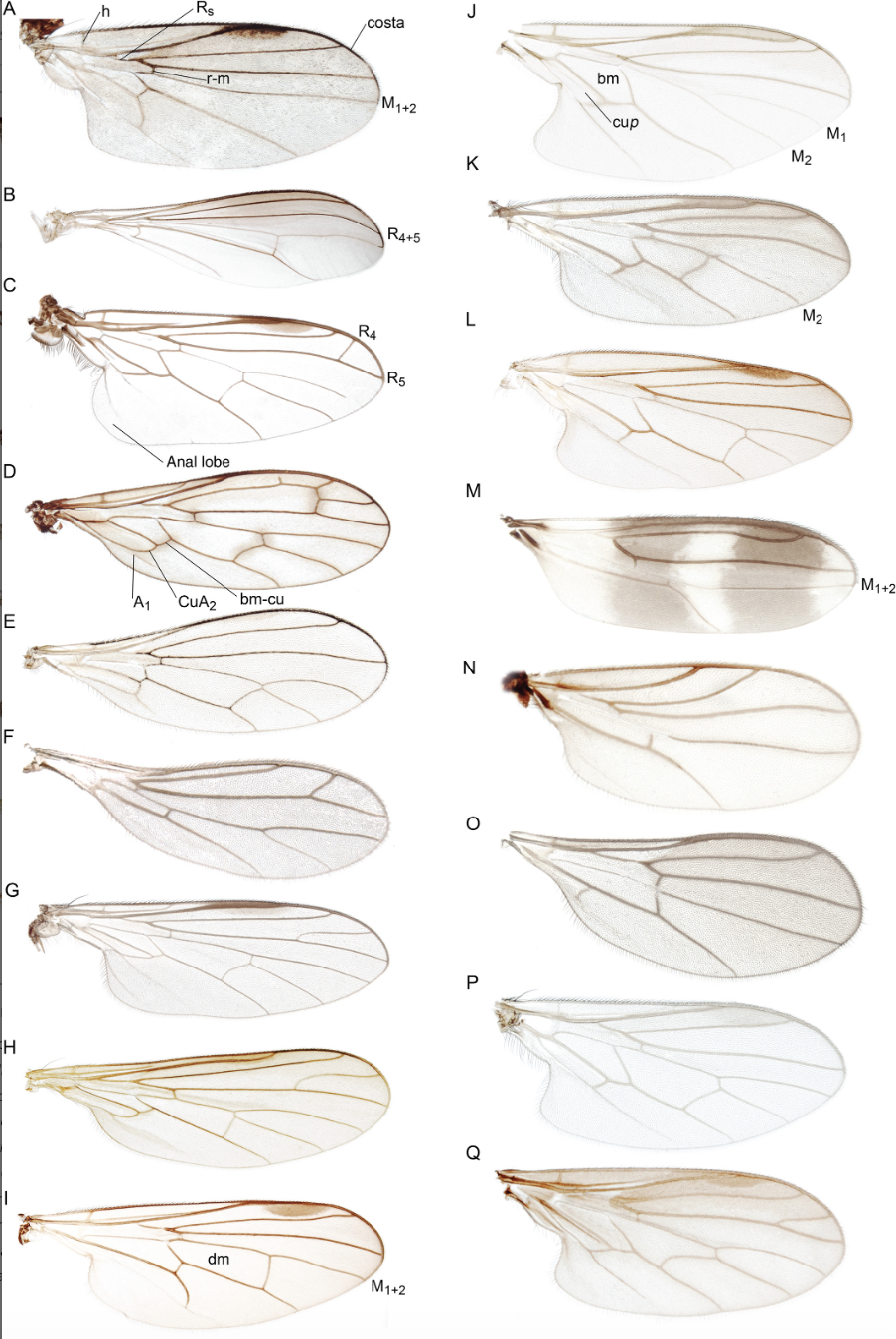
Photographs of right wing of several Empidoidea species. Abbreviations: h, humeral crossvein; R_{s}, radial sector; r‐m, radial‐medial crossvein; M_{1}, first medial vein; M_{1+2}, first and second medial vein (unbranched); R_{4}, fourth radial vein; R_{5}, fifth radial vein; R_{4+5}, fourth and fifth radial vein (unbranched); A_{1}, anal vein; CuA_{2}, second anterior branch of cubital vein; bm‐cu, basal medial‐cubital crossvein; dm, discal medial cell; bm, basal medial cell; cup, posterior cubital cell (anal cell).

The Empidoidea are a large monophyletic superfamily of true flies, the sister taxon to the Muscomorpha (Cyclorrhapha). These two groups are sometimes united in the unranked taxon Eremoneura. There are some 10,000 known species within Empidoidea, which are represented on all continents except Antarctica. They are known to have existed since the Jurassic period.

Empidoidea has been subject to much debate regarding its phylogeny. Based on morphology alone, three major hypotheses had been proposed until 2007 and seemed to be consensus for some time—however, in 2018, Wahlberg & Johanson published the most current phylogeny supported by extensive genetic data, changing the relationship between quite a few families and tribes.

== Description ==
The majority of these insects are predatory, often with large compound eyes (sometimes covering almost the entire surface of the head), and tend to be associated with moist, temperate habitats. Many have a well-developed anal lobe in the wings, and/or a small but distinct anal cell.

Several species within Empidoidea are of particular interest to ethologists and ecologists, due to elaborate mating rituals and life histories involving freshwater.

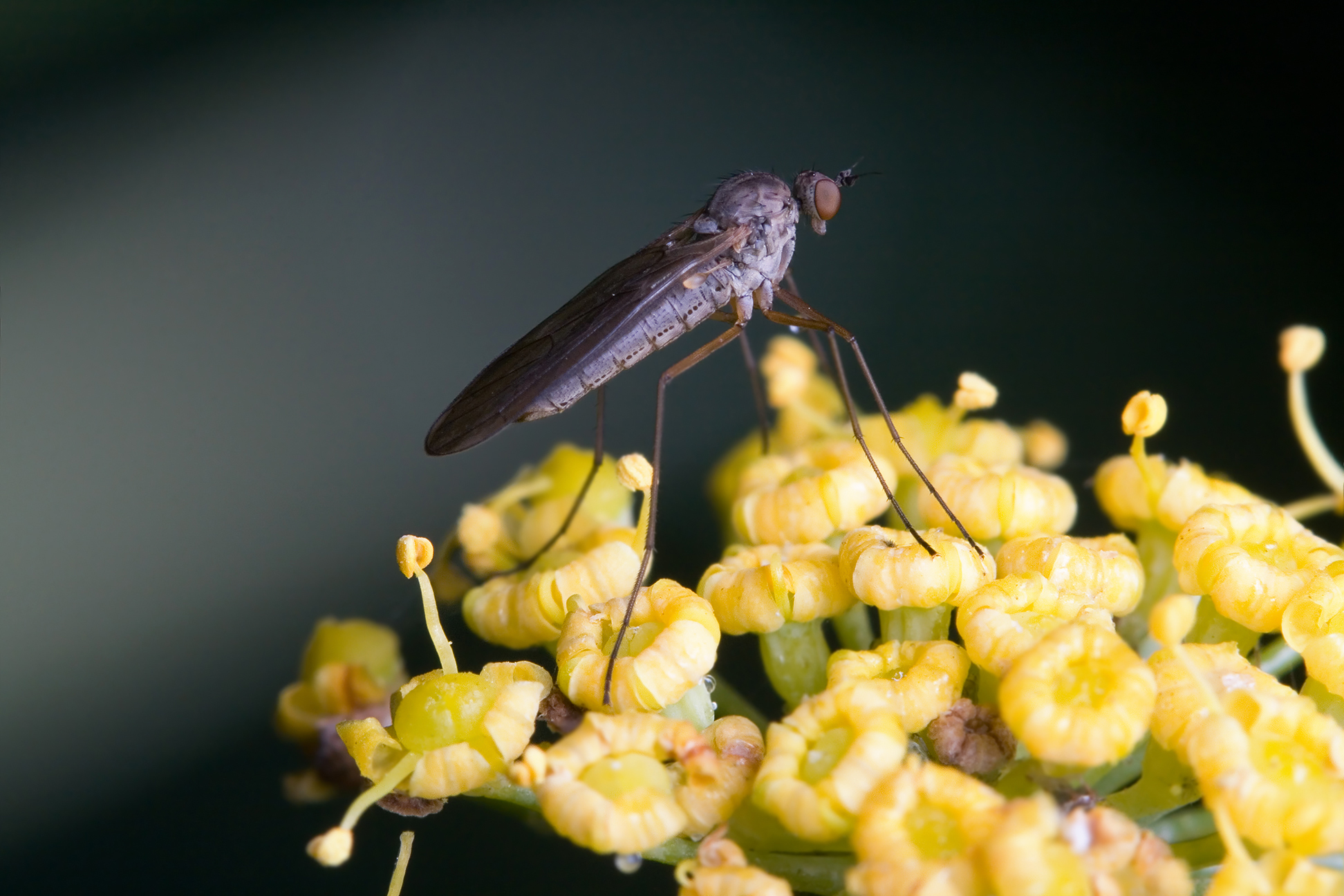
Empidoidea sp.

== Systematics ==
The most familiar families in the group are the Empididae and Dolichopodidae, both of which occur worldwide and contain thousands of species. The smaller families were formerly included in the Empididae, but have since been accorded family status. The monophyly of most of these groups have since been confirmed by subsequent studies. The Brachystomatinae and Microphorinae are sometimes elevated to full family status, too, but this would apparently make the Empididae and Dolichopodidae paraphyletic and thus they are retained as subfamilies here. Atelestidae forming the sister group to the rest of Empidoidea is a unanimous result in all studies that have utilized molecular data.

The families are:

- Atelestidae
- Hybotidae – dance flies
- Dolichopodidae – long-legged flies (including Microphoridae)
- Empididae – dagger flies and balloon flies (including Brachystomatidae)
- Homalocnemiidae
- Oreogetonidae
- Ragadidae

Based on the most recent phylogenetic studies, the internal classification of Empidoidea is as follows:

- Atelestidae
  - Atelestinae
  - Nemedininae
- - Hybotidae
    - Bicellariinae
    - - Tachydromiinae
        - Drapetini
        - - Symballaphthalmini
          - Tachydromiini
      - - Trichininae
        - - Ocydromiinae
          - - Hybotinae
            - Oedaleinae
  - - Dolichopodidae
    - - Ragadidae
        - Iteaphilinae
        - Ragadinae
      - Empididae
        - Clinocerinae
        - - Brachystomatinae
            - Brachystomatini
            - Ceratomerini
            - Trichopezini
          - Empidinae
            - - Chelipodini
              - Empidini
            - - Hemerodromiini
              - Hilarini
