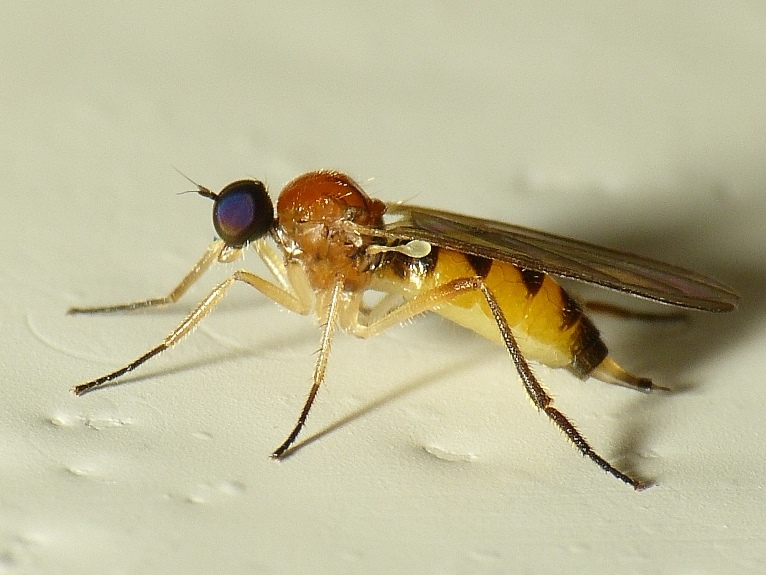
- Leptopeza flavipes Netherlands

Scientific classification
- Kingdom: Animalia
- Phylum: Arthropoda
- Class: Insecta
- Order: Diptera
- Family: Hybotidae
- Subfamily: Ocydromiinae
- Tribe: Ocydromiini
- Genus: Leptopeza
- Species: L. flavipes

Binomial name
- Leptopeza flavipes (Meigen, 1820)

Synonyms
- Tachydromia flavipes Meigen, 1804; Ocydromia ruficollis Meigen, 1820; Ocydromia flavipes Meigen, 1820; Lemtopeza flavipes Macquart, 1828; Lemtopeza tibialis Zetterstedt, 1842; Lemtopeza flavimana Zetterstedt, 1842; Leptopeza nigripes Zetterstedt, 1842

= Leptopeza flavipes =

Species of fly

Leptopeza flavipes is a species of fly in the family Hybotidae. It is found in the Palearctic.
