= Austropeza =

Scientific classification
- Kingdom: Animalia
- Phylum: Arthropoda
- Class: Insecta
- Order: Diptera
- Family: Hybotidae
- Subfamily: Ocydromiinae
- Tribe: Ocydromiini
- Genus: Austropeza; Plant, 1989
- Species: A. insolita

Binomial name
- Austropeza insolita (Collin, 1928)

Synonyms
- Leptopeza insolita Collin, 1928

Genus of flies

Austropeza is a genus of flies in the family Hybotidae. It includes at least one species described from New Zealand, Austropeza isolita, which was originally described by James Edward Collin in 1928 as a species of Leptopeza. The species was originally known only from a single male collected from Waitati in South Island in January 1922. In December 2000, a female of the species was collected from a forest in Hurunui District of South Island.

The species Leptopeza rubrithorax, described from Tasmania, is also included in this genus by some sources.
