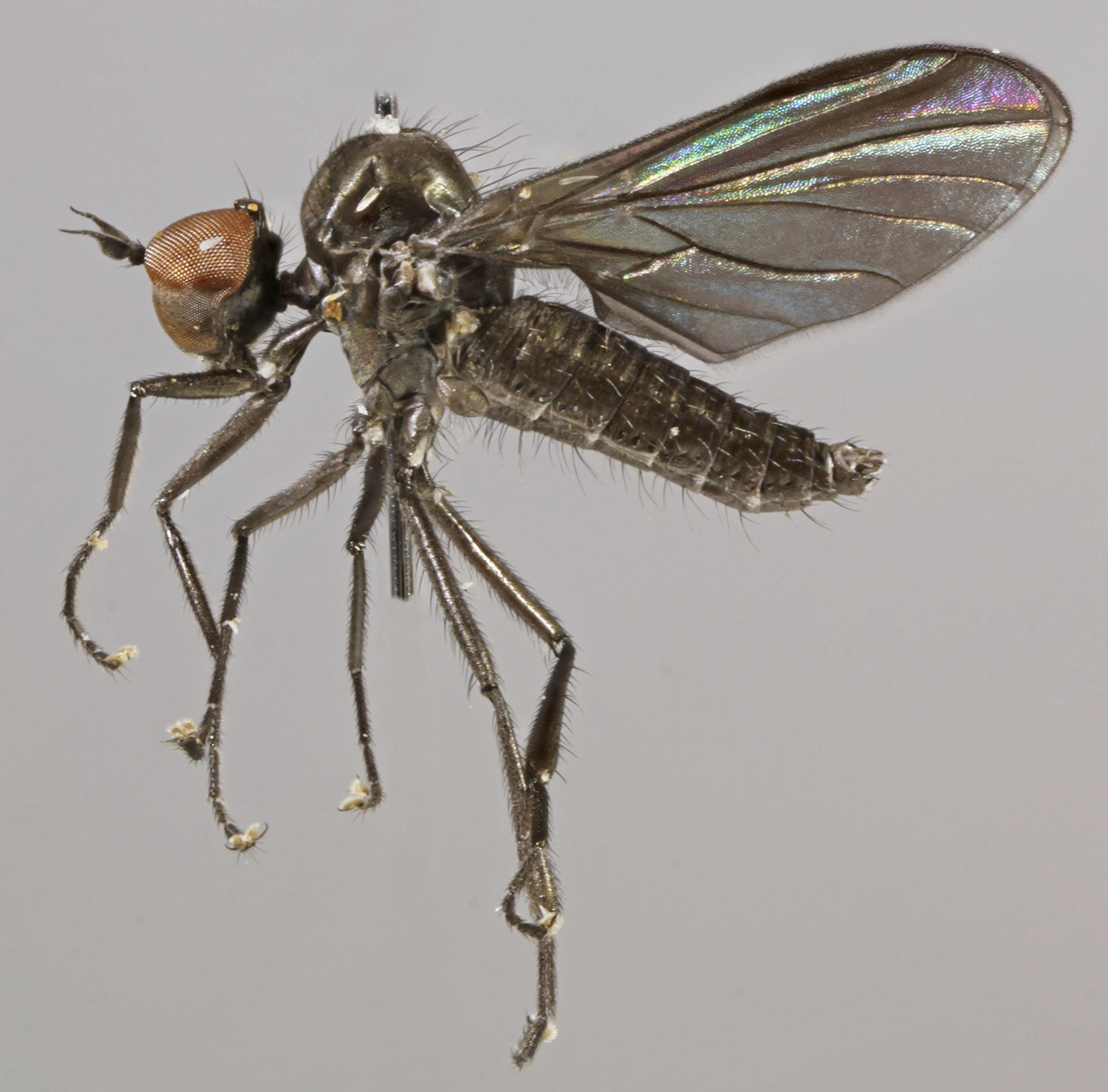
- Bicellaria vana North Wales

Scientific classification
- Kingdom: Animalia
- Phylum: Arthropoda
- Class: Insecta
- Order: Diptera
- Family: Hybotidae
- Subfamily: Ocydromiinae
- Tribe: Bicellariini
- Genus: Bicellaria
- Species: B. vana

Binomial name
- Bicellaria vana Collin, 1926

= Bicellaria vana =

Species of fly

Bicellaria vana is a species of fly in the family Hybotidae. It is found in the Palearctic.
