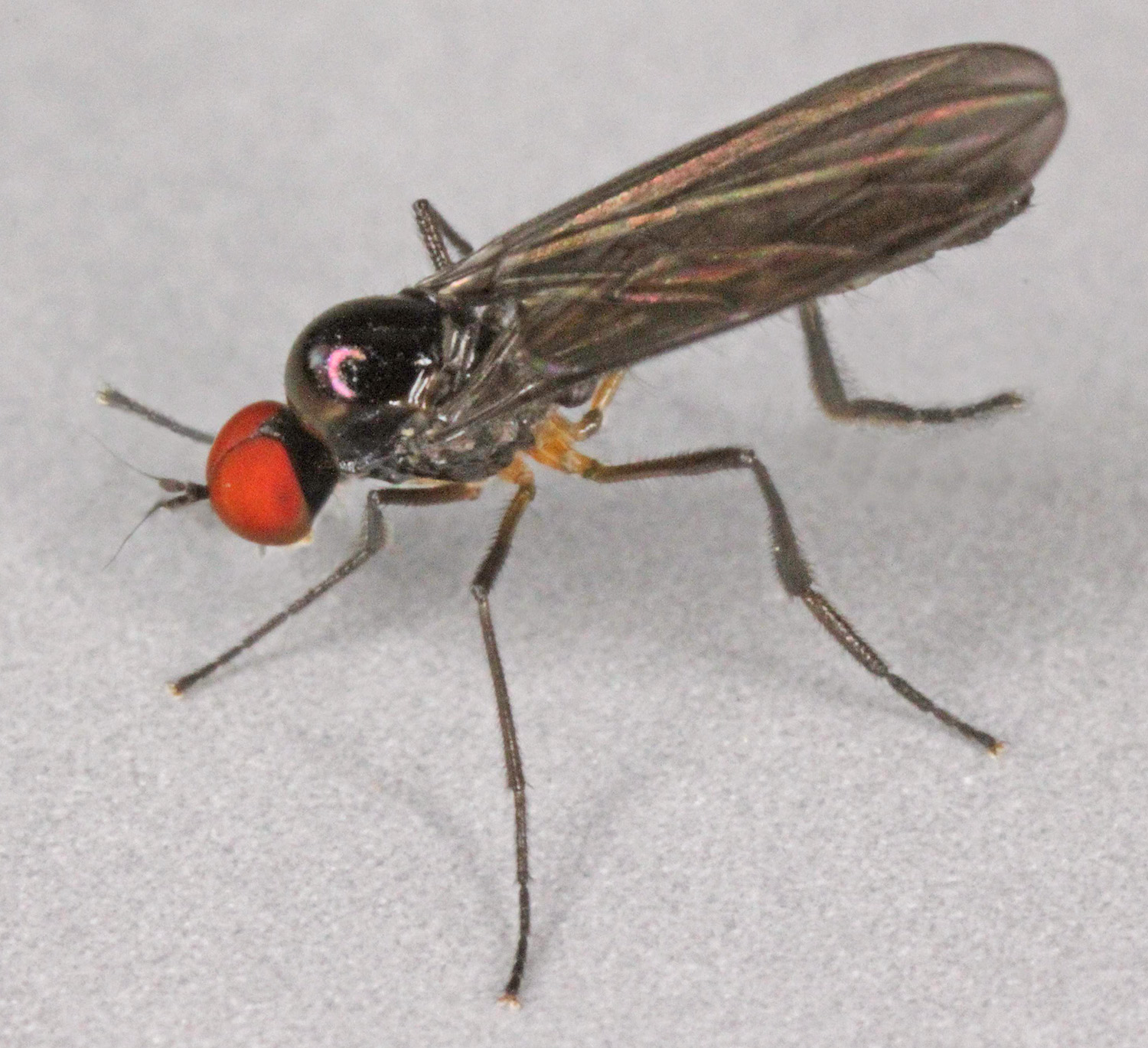

Scientific classification
- Kingdom: Animalia
- Phylum: Arthropoda
- Class: Insecta
- Order: Diptera
- Family: Hybotidae
- Subfamily: Ocydromiinae
- Tribe: Ocydromiini
- Genus: Ocydromia
- Species: O. glabricula

Binomial name
- Ocydromia glabricula (Fallén, 1816)

Synonyms
- Empis glabricula Fallén, 1816; Ocydromia rufipes Meigen, 1820; Ocydromia scutellata Meigen, 1820; Ocydromyia fuscipennis Macquart, 1823; Ocydromia dorsalis Meigen, 1830; Ocydromia coxalis Roser, 1840; Ocydromia peregrinata Walker, 1849

= Ocydromia glabricula =

Species of fly

Ocydromia glabricula is a species of hybotid dance flies in the family Hybotidae.

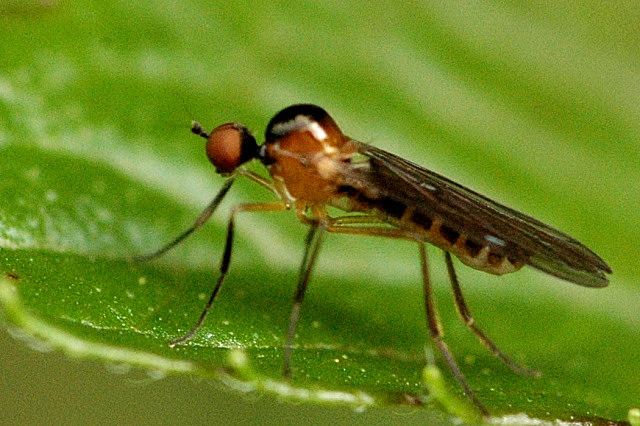

== Distribution ==
United States, Canada, Europe.
