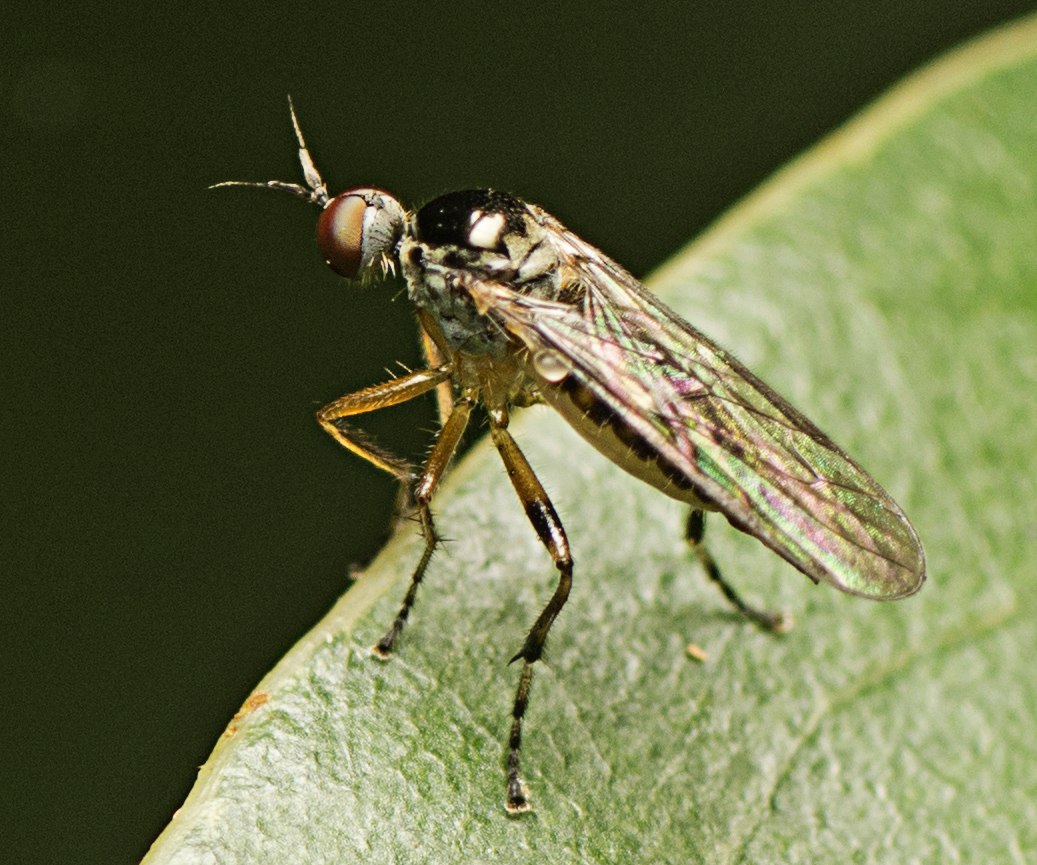
- Hoplopeza pulcherrima

Scientific classification
- Kingdom: Animalia
- Phylum: Arthropoda
- Clade: Pancrustacea
- Class: Insecta
- Order: Diptera
- Family: Hybotidae
- Subfamily: Ocydromiinae
- Tribe: Ocydromiini
- Genus: Hoplopeza; Bezzi, 1909

Type species
- Hoplopeza chloropa Bezzi, 1909

= Hoplopeza =

Genus of flies

Hoplopeza is a genus of flies in the family Hybotidae.

== Species ==
- Hoplopeza annulata Collin, 1933
- Hoplopeza chloropa Bezzi, 1909
- Hoplopeza levicosta (White, 1916)
- Hoplopeza pulcherrima (Bezzi, 1904)
- Hoplopeza serratocosta (White, 1916)
