= Hoplocyrtoma =

Scientific classification
- Kingdom: Animalia
- Phylum: Arthropoda
- Class: Insecta
- Order: Diptera
- Family: Hybotidae
- Subfamily: Ocydromiinae
- Tribe: Bicellariini
- Genus: Hoplocyrtoma; Melander, 1928

Type species
- Cyrtoma procera Loew, 1864

Genus of flies

Hoplocyrtoma is a genus of flies in the family Hybotidae.

== Species ==
- Hoplocyrtoma eocenica Sinclair & Greenwalt, 2022
- Hoplocyrtoma femorata (Loew, 1864)
- Hoplocyrtoma japonica Saigusa & Kato, 2002
- Hoplocyrtoma procera (Loew, 1864)
- Hoplocyrtoma watanabei Saigusa & Kato, 2002
