= Nemedromia =

Nemedromia Temporal range: Turonian-Campanian

Scientific classification
- Kingdom: Animalia
- Phylum: Arthropoda
- Class: Insecta
- Order: Diptera
- Family: Atelestidae
- Subfamily: Nemedininae
- Genus: †Nemedromia; Grimaldi and Cumming, 1999

Type species
- Nemedromia campania Grimaldi and Cumming, 1999

Species
- Nemedromia campania; Nemedromia turonia; Nemedromia telescopica

Extinct genus of fly

Nemedromia is a genus of true fly in the family Atelestidae. Nemedromia is extinct, with all three of its known species having existed in the Late Cretaceous epoch.
