= Leptodromiella =

Scientific classification
- Kingdom: Animalia
- Phylum: Arthropoda
- Class: Insecta
- Order: Diptera
- Family: Hybotidae
- Subfamily: Ocydromiinae
- Tribe: Ocydromiini
- Genus: Leptodromiella; Tuomikoski, 1936

Type species
- Oropezella crassiseta Tuomikoski, 1932

Genus of flies

Leptodromiella is a genus of flies in the family Hybotidae.

== Species ==
- Leptodromiella crassiseta (Tuomikoski, 1932)
