= Oreogetonidae =

Scientific classification
- Domain: Eukaryota
- Kingdom: Animalia
- Phylum: Arthropoda
- Class: Insecta
- Order: Diptera
- Suborder: Brachycera
- Infraorder: Asilomorpha
- Superfamily: Empidoidea
- Family: Oreogetonidae; Chvála, 1976

Family of flies

Oreogetonidae is a family of flies in the order Diptera, belonging to the superfamily Empidoidea. The family comprises a single genus, Oreogeton, with 36 described species. These flies are widely distributed across North America, Europe, Asia, Australia, New Zealand, and particularly South America, where the majority of species are found.

== Description ==
Oreogetonidae are small to medium-sized, slender flies characterized by broad wings with a large anal lobe. Their wing venation includes distinctive patterns: the radial vein branches into four, the medial vein into three, and a large, irregular pentagonal discal cell is present in the wing's center. The two anal veins are weak and do not reach the wing margin. Additional features include a head with large compound eyes and a prolonged proboscis, antennae with three or fewer segments (often with a stylus or arista), and a thorax with bristles primarily on the notopleural and scutellar regions. The legs vary in form, occasionally modified, and the abdomen may be elongated or short depending on the species.

== Distribution ==
The family Oreogetonidae is globally distributed, with a significant concentration of its 36 species in South America. They are also recorded in North America, Europe (e.g., Oreogeton basalis in Central Europe up to Germany and Poland), Asia (e.g., Oreogeton nippon in Japan), Australia, and New Zealand. This wide range indicates their adaptability to diverse ecological conditions.

== Biology ==
Adult Oreogetonidae are diurnal, meaning they are active during the day, and are predatory, feeding on other insects. The larvae are aquatic, inhabiting freshwater environments, and are also predatory, preying on small aquatic organisms such as mosquito larvae. This predatory behavior is typical of the superfamily Empidoidea.

== Ecological Role ==
Oreogetonidae contribute to the regulation of insect populations as adults and play a role in freshwater food webs as larvae. By preying on other insects, including mosquito larvae, the larvae may influence aquatic ecosystems, potentially aiding in natural pest control. Their presence across varied habitats highlights their ecological versatility.
