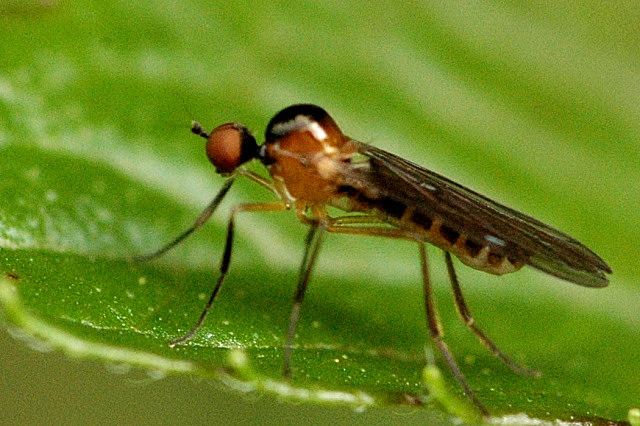
- Ocydromia glabricula female

Scientific classification
- Kingdom: Animalia
- Phylum: Arthropoda
- Class: Insecta
- Order: Diptera
- Family: Hybotidae
- Subfamily: Ocydromiinae
- Tribe: Ocydromiini
- Genus: Ocydromia; Meigen, 1820

Synonyms
- Ocydromyia Bigot, 1888; Ocydromyia Macquart, 1823

= Ocydromia =

Genus of flies

Ocydromia is a genus of flies in the family Hybotidae.

== Species ==
- Ocydromia amazonica Rafael, 1991
- Ocydromia glabricula (Fallén, 1816)
- Ocydromia hirsutipes Becker, 1914
- Ocydromia melanopleura Loew, 1840
- Ocydromia shanxiensis Li, Wang & Yang, 2013
- Ocydromia stigmatica Frey, 1953
- Ocydromia tenuis Smith, 1969
- Ocydromia unifasciata (Brunetti, 1913)
- Ocydromia xiaowutaiensis Yang & Gaimari, 2005
