= Homalocnemis =

Scientific classification
- Kingdom: Animalia
- Phylum: Arthropoda
- Class: Insecta
- Order: Diptera
- Suborder: Brachycera
- Infraorder: Asilomorpha
- Superfamily: Empidoidea
- Family: Homalocnemidae; Collin, 1928
- Genus: Homalocnemis; Philippi, 1865

Type species
- Homalocnemis nigripennis Philippi, 1865

Genus of flies

Homalocnemis is a genus of flies which is placed in a family of its own, the Homalocnemidae. There are about seven species in the genus found in the Afrotropical, Neotropical, and Australasian regions, suggestive of a Gondwanan origin. The genus was formerly considered a primitive empidoid and placed variously in the Hybotidae or in the empidid subfamily Brachystomatinae. They are recognized by their wing venation which includes a long anal cell and a long basal segment of the antennal style.

Species in the genus include:

New Zealand

- H. adelensis (Miller, 1913)
- H. inexpleta Collin, 1928
- H. perspicua (Hutton, 1901)
- H. maculipennis Malloch, 1932

Namibia

- H. namibiensis Chvála, 1991

Chile

- H. praesumpta Collin, 1928
- H. nigripennis Philippi, 1865
