= Scelolabes =

Scientific classification
- Kingdom: Animalia
- Phylum: Arthropoda
- Class: Insecta
- Order: Diptera
- Family: Hybotidae
- Subfamily: Ocydromiinae
- Tribe: Ocydromiini
- Genus: Scelolabes; Philippi, 1865

Type species
- Scelolabes bivittatus Philippi, 1865

Genus of flies

Scelolabes is a genus of flies in the family Hybotidae.

== Species ==
- Scelolabes bivittatus Philippi, 1865
