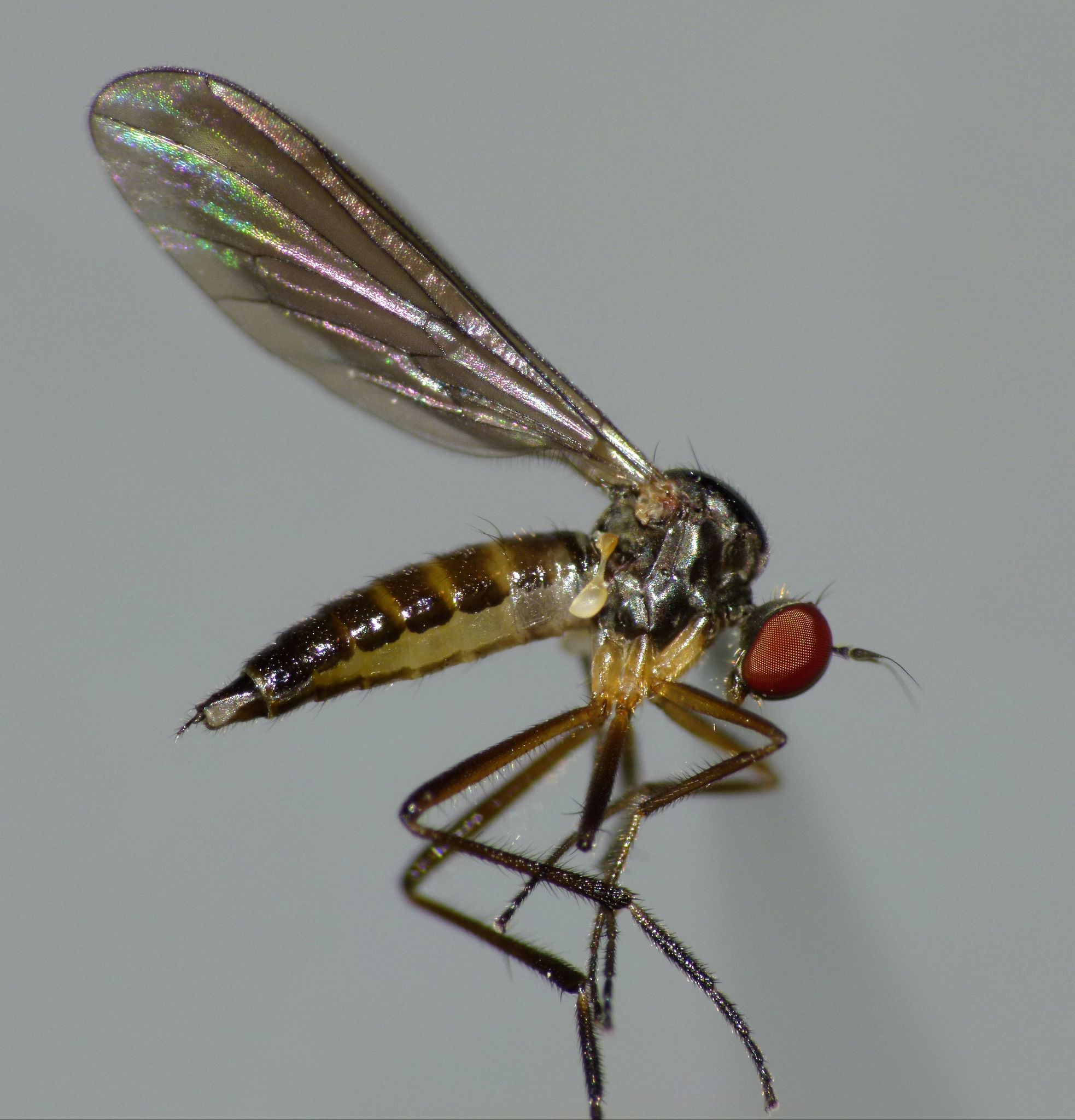
- Oropezella bifurcata

Scientific classification
- Kingdom: Animalia
- Phylum: Arthropoda
- Class: Insecta
- Order: Diptera
- Family: Hybotidae
- Subfamily: Ocydromiinae
- Tribe: Ocydromiini
- Genus: Oropezella; Collin, 1926

Synonyms
- Leptometopiella Melander, 1928

= Oropezella =

Genus of flies

Oropezella is a genus of flies in the family Hybotidae.

== Species ==
- Oropezella abdominalis Collin, 1933
- Oropezella annulitarsis Smith, 1962
- Oropezella antennata Collin, 1928
- Oropezella aquila Ale-Rocha & Freitas-Silva, 2014
- Oropezella arara Smith, 1962
- Oropezella arcuata Ale-Rocha & Freitas-Silva, 2014
- Oropezella bicolor Ale-Rocha & Freitas-Silva, 2014
- Oropezella bifurcata Collin, 1928
- Oropezella biloba Smith, 1962
- Oropezella bipunctata Ale-Rocha & Freitas-Silva, 2014
- Oropezella clavata Ale-Rocha & Freitas-Silva, 2014
- Oropezella costaricensis Ale-Rocha & Freitas-Silva, 2014
- Oropezella diminuloruma Plant, 1989
- Oropezella falcata Ale-Rocha & Freitas-Silva, 2014
- Oropezella flavida Ale-Rocha & Freitas-Silva, 2014
- Oropezella granulosa Ale-Rocha & Freitas-Silva, 2014
- Oropezella longifrons Ale-Rocha & Freitas-Silva, 2014
- Oropezella loripes Plant, 1989
- Oropezella marginata Smith, 1962
- Oropezella metallica Smith, 1962
- Oropezella nigra (Miller, 1923)
- Oropezella planti Ale-Rocha & Freitas-Silva, 2014
- Oropezella plaumanni Ale-Rocha & Freitas-Silva, 2014
- Oropezella pseudotetraocellata Ale-Rocha, 2001
- Oropezella rafaeli Ale-Rocha & Freitas-Silva, 2014
- Oropezella spathula Ale-Rocha & Freitas-Silva, 2014
- Oropezella sphenoptera (Loew, 1873)
- Oropezella tanycera Collin, 1928
- Oropezella taquara Smith, 1962
- Oropezella trucispicata Plant, 1989
- Oropezella uncata Ale-Rocha & Freitas-Silva, 2014
- Oropezella undulata Ale-Rocha & Freitas-Silva, 2014
