= Neotrichina =

Scientific classification
- Kingdom: Animalia
- Phylum: Arthropoda
- Class: Insecta
- Order: Diptera
- Family: Hybotidae
- Subfamily: Ocydromiinae
- Tribe: Ocydromiini
- Genus: Neotrichina; Cumming, 2000

Type species
- Trichina obscurata Collin, 1933

Genus of flies

Neotrichina is a genus of flies in the family Hybotidae.

== Species ==
- Neotrichina abdominalis (Collin, 1933)
- Neotrichina digna (Collin, 1933)
- Neotrichina digressa (Collin, 1933)
- Neotrichina distincta (Collin, 1933)
- Neotrichina elegans (Bigot, 1888)
- Neotrichina fida (Collin, 1933)
- Neotrichina indiga (Collin, 1933)
- Neotrichina insignis (Collin, 1933)
- Neotrichina insons (Collin, 1933)
- Neotrichina laeta (Collin, 1933)
- Neotrichina media (Collin, 1933)
- Neotrichina obscurata (Collin, 1933)
