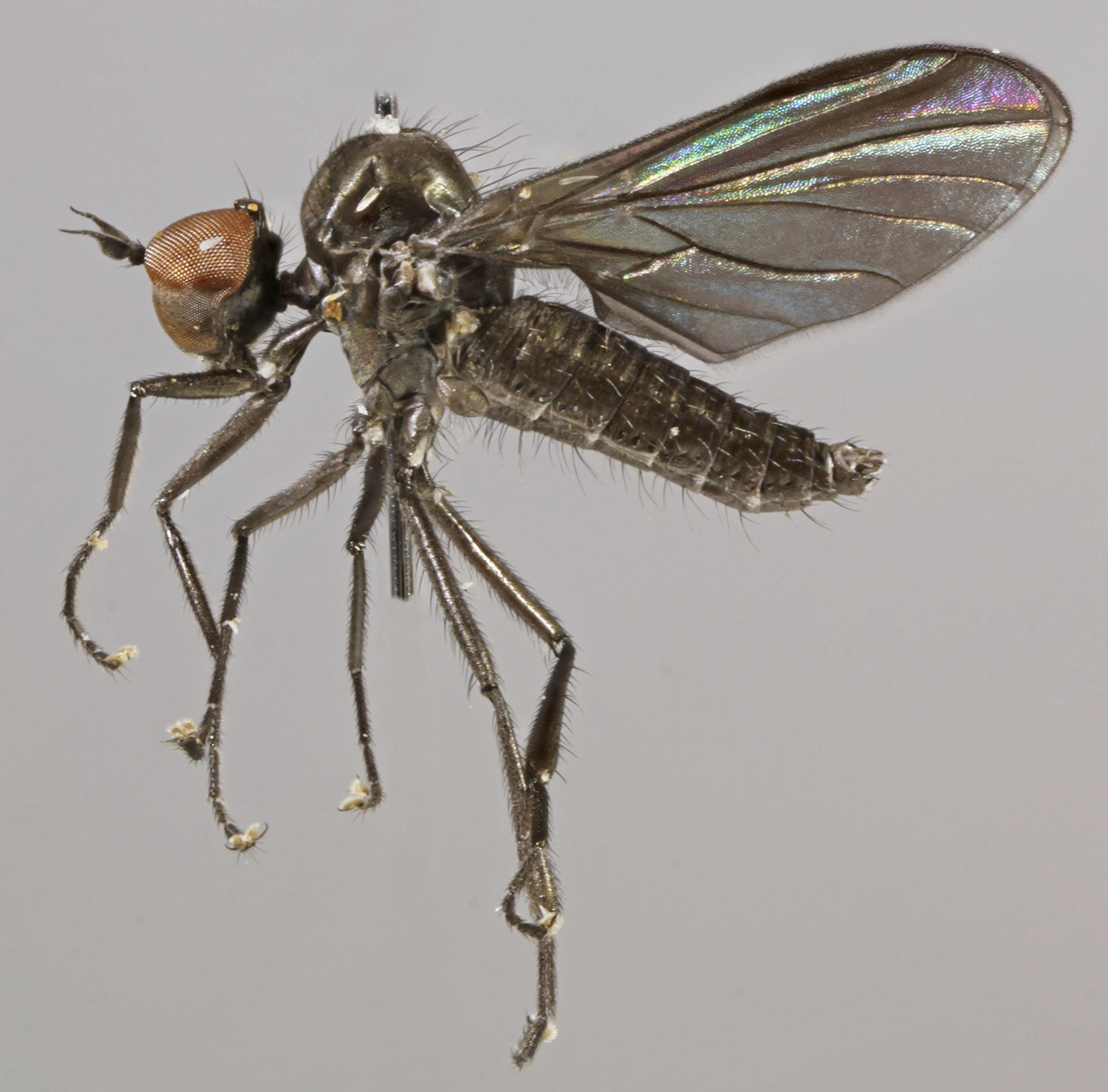
- Bicellaria vana

Scientific classification
- Kingdom: Animalia
- Phylum: Arthropoda
- Clade: Pancrustacea
- Class: Insecta
- Order: Diptera
- Family: Hybotidae
- Subfamily: Ocydromiinae
- Tribe: Bicellariini
- Genus: Bicellaria; Macquart, 1823

Type species
- Bicellaria nigra Macquart, 1823

Synonyms
- Cyrtoma Meigen, 1824; Henicopteryx Agassiz, 1846

= Bicellaria =

Genus of flies

Bicellaria is a genus of flies in the family of Hybotidae.

== Species ==
- Bicellaria albopilosa Chvála, 1991
- Bicellaria alpina Bezzi, 1918
- Bicellaria amankutanensis Barták, Plant & Kubík, 2013
- Bicellaria angustifurca Melander, 1928
- Bicellaria austriaca Tuomikoski, 1955
- Bicellaria bisetosa Tuomikoski, 1936
- Bicellaria brevifurca Melander, 1928
- Bicellaria chimganensis Barták, Plant & Kubík, 2013
- Bicellaria collina Philippi, 1865
- Bicellaria collini Tuomikoski, 1955
- Bicellaria croatica Barták & Kokan, 2021
- Bicellaria dispar Oldenberg, 1920
- Bicellaria drapetoides (Walker, 1849)
- Bicellaria expulsa (Walker, 1857)
- Bicellaria farkaci Barták, Plant & Kubík, 2013
- Bicellaria femorata Collin, 1960
- Bicellaria flavipes Kato, 1971
- Bicellaria furcifer Melander, 1928
- Bicellaria globulicauda Barták, Plant & Kubík, 2013
- Bicellaria halteralis (Loew, 1862)
- Bicellaria halterata Collin, 1961
- Bicellaria ingrata Collin, 1960
- Bicellaria intermedia Lundbeck, 1910
- Bicellaria japonica Kato, 1971
- Bicellaria koreana Barták, Plant & Kubík, 2013
- Bicellaria kovalevi Barták, Plant & Kubík, 2013
- Bicellaria longipes (Loew, 1862)
- Bicellaria longisetosa Chvála, 1991
- Bicellaria lugubris Melander, 1928
- Bicellaria mera Collin, 1961
- Bicellaria nigra (Meigen, 1824)
- Bicellaria nigrita Collin, 1926
- Bicellaria pectinata Melander, 1928
- Bicellaria pilipes (Loew, 1862)
- Bicellaria pilosa Lundbeck, 1910
- Bicellaria setitibia Barták, Plant & Kubík, 2013
- Bicellaria shatalkini Barták, Plant & Kubík, 2013
- Bicellaria simplicipes (Zetterstedt, 1842)
- Bicellaria spuria (Fallén, 1816)
- Bicellaria stackelbergi Tuomikoski, 1955
- Bicellaria subpilosa Collin, 1926
- Bicellaria sulcata (Zetterstedt, 1842)
- Bicellaria thailandica Barták, Plant & Kubík, 2013
- Bicellaria uvens Melander, 1928
- Bicellaria vana Collin, 1926
- Bicellaria woodi Barták, Plant & Kubík, 2013
