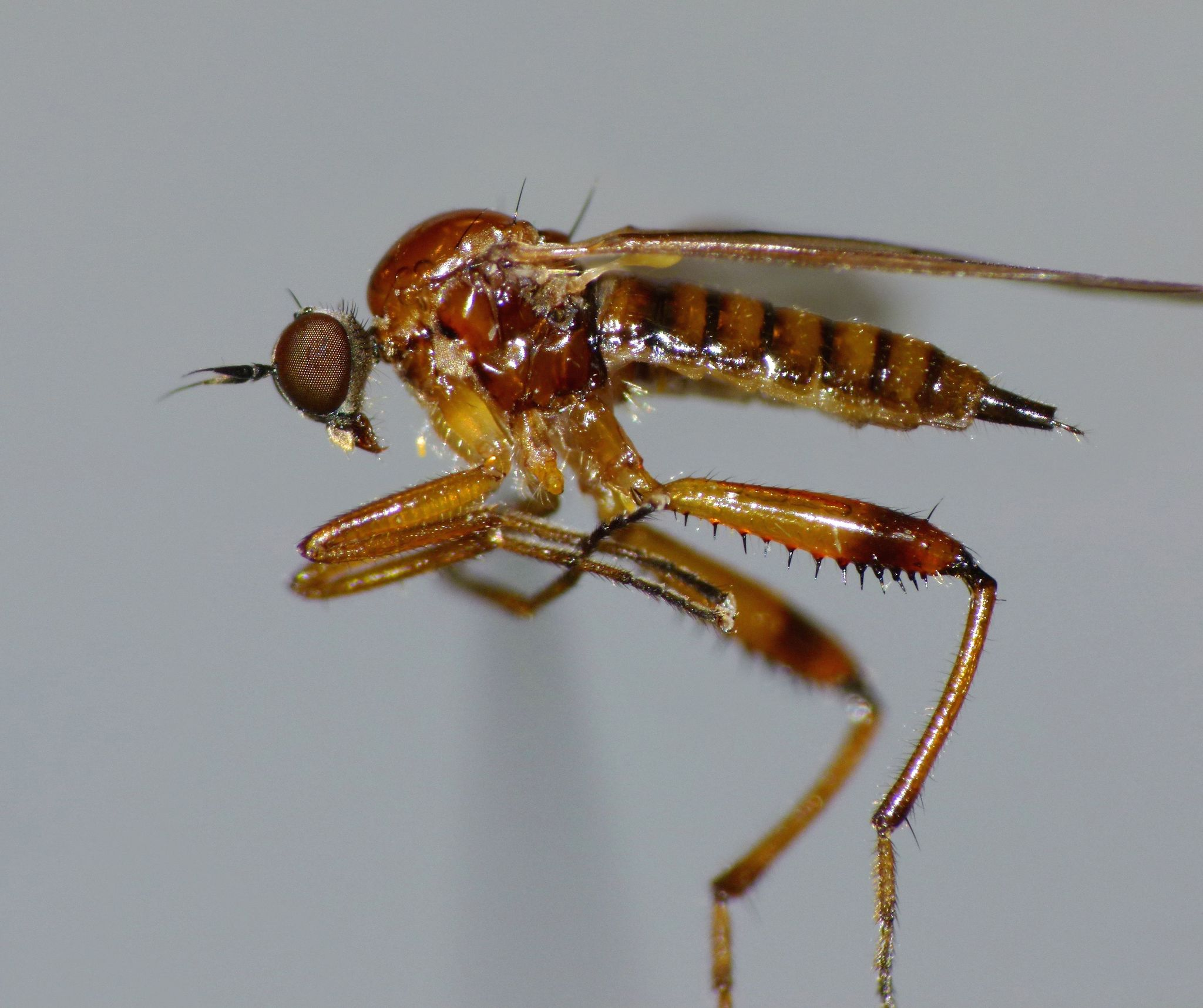
- Pseudoscelolabes fulvescens

Scientific classification
- Kingdom: Animalia
- Phylum: Arthropoda
- Class: Insecta
- Order: Diptera
- Family: Hybotidae
- Subfamily: Ocydromiinae
- Tribe: Ocydromiini
- Genus: Pseudoscelolabes; Collin, 1933

Type species
- Leptopeza fulvescens Miller, 1923

= Pseudoscelolabes =

Genus of flies

Pseudoscelolabes is a genus of flies in the family Hybotidae.

== Species ==
- Pseudoscelolabes fulvescens (Miller, 1923)
- Pseudoscelolabes lesagei Sinclair & Barros, 2022
