= Cretodromia =

Cretodromia Temporal range: Campanian

Scientific classification
- Kingdom: Animalia
- Phylum: Arthropoda
- Class: Insecta
- Order: Diptera
- Family: Atelestidae
- Subfamily: Nemedininae
- Genus: †Cretodromia; Grimaldi and Cumming, 1999
- Species: †C. glaesa

Binomial name
- †Cretodromia glaesa Grimaldi and Cumming, 1999

Extinct genus of fly

Cretodromia is a genus of true fly in the family Atelestidae. Cretodromia contains no living members, with the only known species Cretodromia glaesa having existed in the Campanian age of the Late Cretaceous epoch.
