= Abocciputa =

Scientific classification
- Kingdom: Animalia
- Phylum: Arthropoda
- Class: Insecta
- Order: Diptera
- Family: Hybotidae
- Subfamily: Ocydromiinae
- Tribe: Ocydromiini
- Genus: Abocciputa; Plant, 1989

Type species
- Abocciputa pilosa Plant, 1989

Genus of flies

Abocciputa is a genus of flies in the family Hybotidae. The sole species, Abocciputa pilosa, was described by Adrian R.Plant in 1989.

== Species ==
- Abocciputa pilosa Plant, 1989
