= Leptocyrtoma =

Scientific classification
- Kingdom: Animalia
- Phylum: Arthropoda
- Class: Insecta
- Order: Diptera
- Family: Hybotidae
- Subfamily: Ocydromiinae
- Tribe: Bicellariini
- Genus: Leptocyrtoma; Saigusa, 1986

Type species
- Leptocyrtoma shirozui Saigusa, 1986

Genus of flies

Leptocyrtoma is a genus of flies in the family Hybotidae.

== Species ==
- Leptocyrtoma shirozui Saigusa, 1986

== Distribution ==
Nepal.
