= Leptodromia =

Scientific classification
- Kingdom: Animalia
- Phylum: Arthropoda
- Class: Insecta
- Order: Diptera
- Family: Hybotidae
- Subfamily: Ocydromiinae
- Tribe: Ocydromiini
- Genus: Leptodromia; Sinclair & Cumming, 2000

Type species
- Leptopeza bimaculata Bezzi, 1904

Genus of flies

Leptodromia is a genus of flies in the family Hybotidae.

== Species ==
- Leptodromia bimaculata (Bezzi, 1904)
