= Apterodromia =

Scientific classification
- Kingdom: Animalia
- Phylum: Arthropoda
- Class: Insecta
- Order: Diptera
- Family: Hybotidae
- Subfamily: Ocydromiinae
- Tribe: Ocydromiini
- Genus: Apterodromia; Oldroyd, 1949

Type species
- Apterodromia evansi Oldroyd, 1949

Genus of flies

Apterodromia is a genus of flies in the family Hybotidae.

== Species ==
- Apterodromia aurea Sinclair & Cumming, 2000
- Apterodromia bickeli Sinclair & Cumming, 2000
- Apterodromia evansi Oldroyd, 1949
- Apterodromia irrorata Sinclair & Cumming, 2000
- Apterodromia minuta Sinclair & Cumming, 2000
- Apterodromia monticola Sinclair & Cumming, 2000
- Apterodromia pala Sinclair & Cumming, 2000
- Apterodromia setosa Sinclair & Cumming, 2000
- Apterodromia spilota Sinclair & Cumming, 2000
- Apterodromia tasmanica Sinclair & Cumming, 2000
- Apterodromia tonnoiri Sinclair & Cumming, 2000
- Apterodromia vespertina Sinclair & Cumming, 2000
