= Stylocydromia =

Scientific classification
- Kingdom: Animalia
- Phylum: Arthropoda
- Class: Insecta
- Order: Diptera
- Family: Hybotidae
- Subfamily: Ocydromiinae
- Tribe: Ocydromiini
- Genus: Stylocydromia; Saigusa, 1986

Type species
- Stylocydromia annulata Saigusa, 1986

Genus of flies

Stylocydromia is a genus of flies in the family Hybotidae.

== Species ==
- Stylocydromia annulata Saigusa, 1986
