= Ragas (fly) =

Scientific classification
- Kingdom: Animalia
- Phylum: Arthropoda
- Class: Insecta
- Order: Diptera
- Family: Empididae
- Genus: Ragas; Walker, 1837

Genus of insects

Ragas is a genus of flies belonging to the family Empididae.

The species of this genus are found in Europe and Northern America.

Species:

- Ragas alpina Sinclair & Saigusa, 2001
- Ragas baltica Sinclair & Hoffeins, 2013
