= Brachemys =

Scientific classification
- Domain: Eukaryota
- Kingdom: Animalia
- Phylum: Arthropoda
- Class: Insecta
- Order: Coleoptera
- Suborder: Polyphaga
- Infraorder: Cucujiformia
- Family: Melyridae
- Genus: Brachemys; Abeille de Perrin, 1890

Synonyms
- Atelestus Erichson, 1840

Genus of insects

Brachemys is a genus of beetles belonging to the family Melyridae.

The species of this genus are found in Europe.

Species:

- Brachemys brevipennis (Laporte de Castelnau, 1838)
- Brachemys demelti Evers, 1961
