= Anthepiscopus =

Scientific classification
- Domain: Eukaryota
- Kingdom: Animalia
- Phylum: Arthropoda
- Class: Insecta
- Order: Diptera
- Family: Empididae
- Genus: Anthepiscopus; Becker, 1891

Genus of flies

Anthepiscopus is a genus of flies belonging to the family Empididae.

The species of this genus are found in Europe and Northern America.

Species:

- Anthepiscopus antipodus Bezzi, 1904
- Anthepiscopus caelebs Becker, 1891
