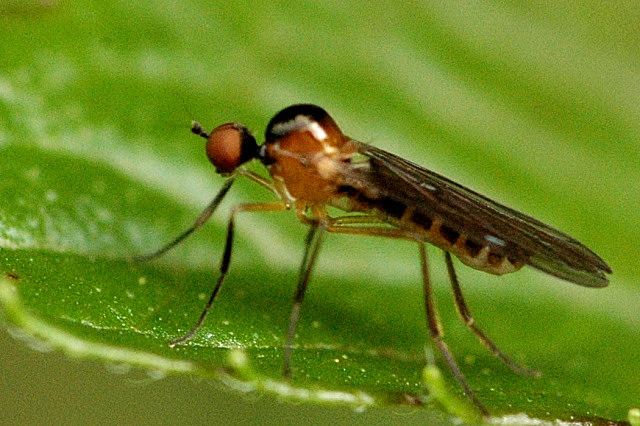
- Ocydromia glabricula

Scientific classification
- Domain: Eukaryota
- Kingdom: Animalia
- Phylum: Arthropoda
- Class: Insecta
- Order: Diptera
- Family: Hybotidae
- Subfamily: Ocydromiinae
- Tribe: Ocydromiini; Chvála, 1983

= Ocydromiini =

Subfamily of flies

Ocydromiini is a tribe of hybotid flies.

== Genera ==
- Abocciputa Plant, 1989
- Apterodromia Oldroyd, 1949
- Austropeza Plant, 1989
- Hoplopeza Bezzi, 1909
- Leptodromiella Tuomikoski, 1936
- Leptodromia Sinclair & Cumming, 2000
- Leptopeza Macquart, 1834
- Neotrichina Cumming, 2000
- Ocydromia Meigen, 1820
- Oropezella Collin, 1926
- Pseudoscelolabes Collin, 1933
- Scelolabes Philippi, 1865
- Stylocydromia Saigusa, 1986
