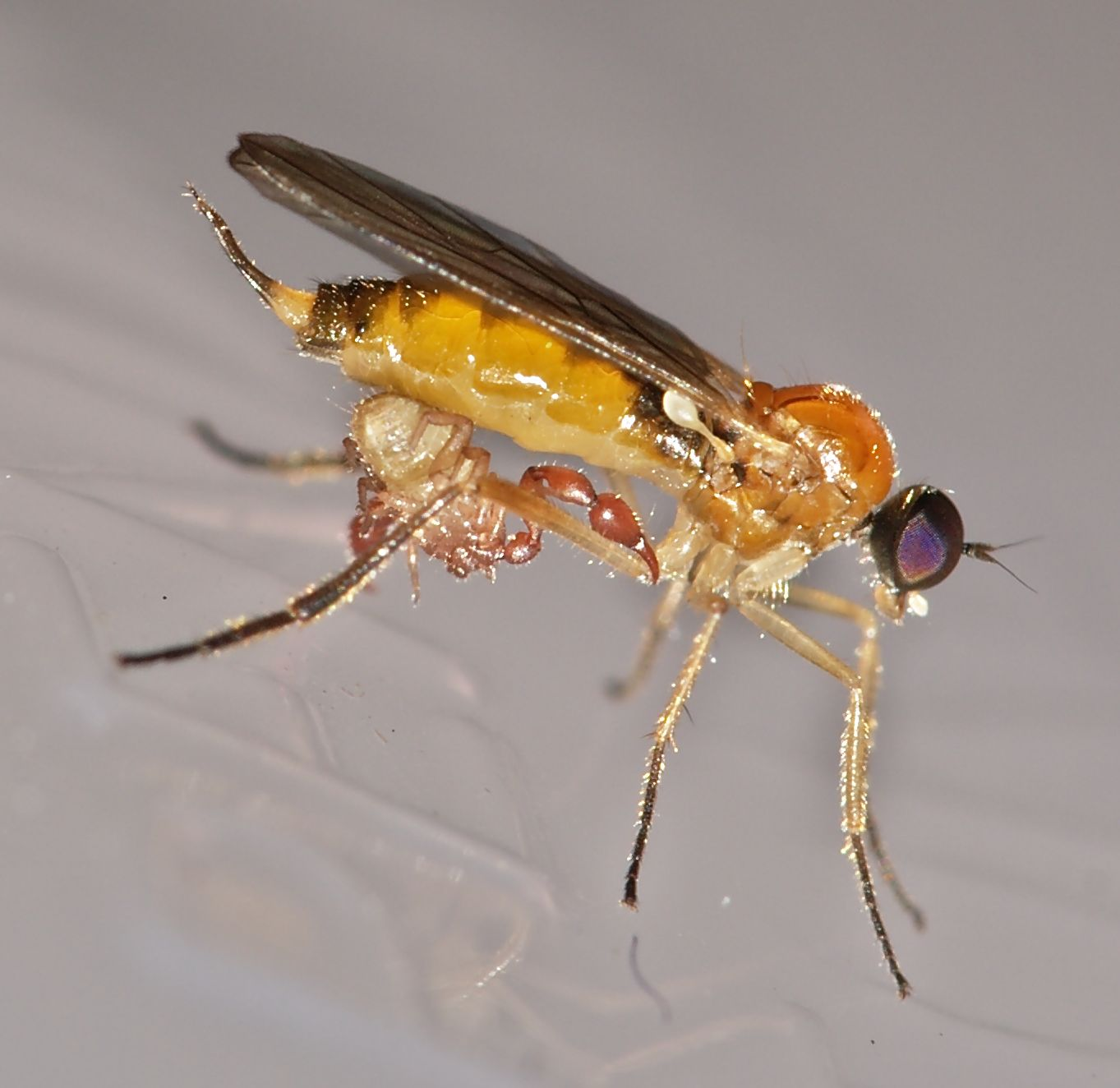
- Leptopeza flavipes with Lamprochernes

Scientific classification
- Kingdom: Animalia
- Phylum: Arthropoda
- Class: Insecta
- Order: Diptera
- Family: Hybotidae
- Subfamily: Ocydromiinae
- Tribe: Ocydromiini
- Genus: Leptopeza; Macquart, 1828

Type species
- Leptopeza flavipes Macquart, 1828

Synonyms
- Lemptopeza Verrall, 1882; Lemtopeza Bigot, 1889; Leptopeza Agassiz, 1846

= Leptopeza =

Genus of flies

Leptopeza is a genus of flies in the family Hybotidae.

== Species ==
- Leptopeza antennalis Melander, 1928
- Leptopeza biplagiata (Bezzi, 1912)
- Leptopeza borealis Zetterstedt, 1842
- Leptopeza clavipes Loew, 1850
- Leptopeza compta Coquillett, 1895
- Leptopeza coninna Meunier, 1908
- Leptopeza disparilis Melander, 1902
- Leptopeza flaviantennalis Kato, 1971
- Leptopeza flavipes (Meigen, 1820)
- Leptopeza javana Meijere, 1913
- Leptopeza rivosa Bigot, 1888
- Leptopeza rubrithorax White, 1916
- Leptopeza tachydromiaeformis Bezzi, 1904
