= Atelestus (fly) =

Scientific classification
- Kingdom: Animalia
- Phylum: Arthropoda
- Class: Insecta
- Order: Diptera
- Family: Atelestidae
- Genus: Atelestus; Walker, 1837

Genus of flies

Atelestus is a genus of flies belonging to the family Atelestidae.

The species of this genus are found in Europe.

Species:

- Atelestus dissonans Collin, 1961
- Atelestus pulicarius (Fallen, 1816)
