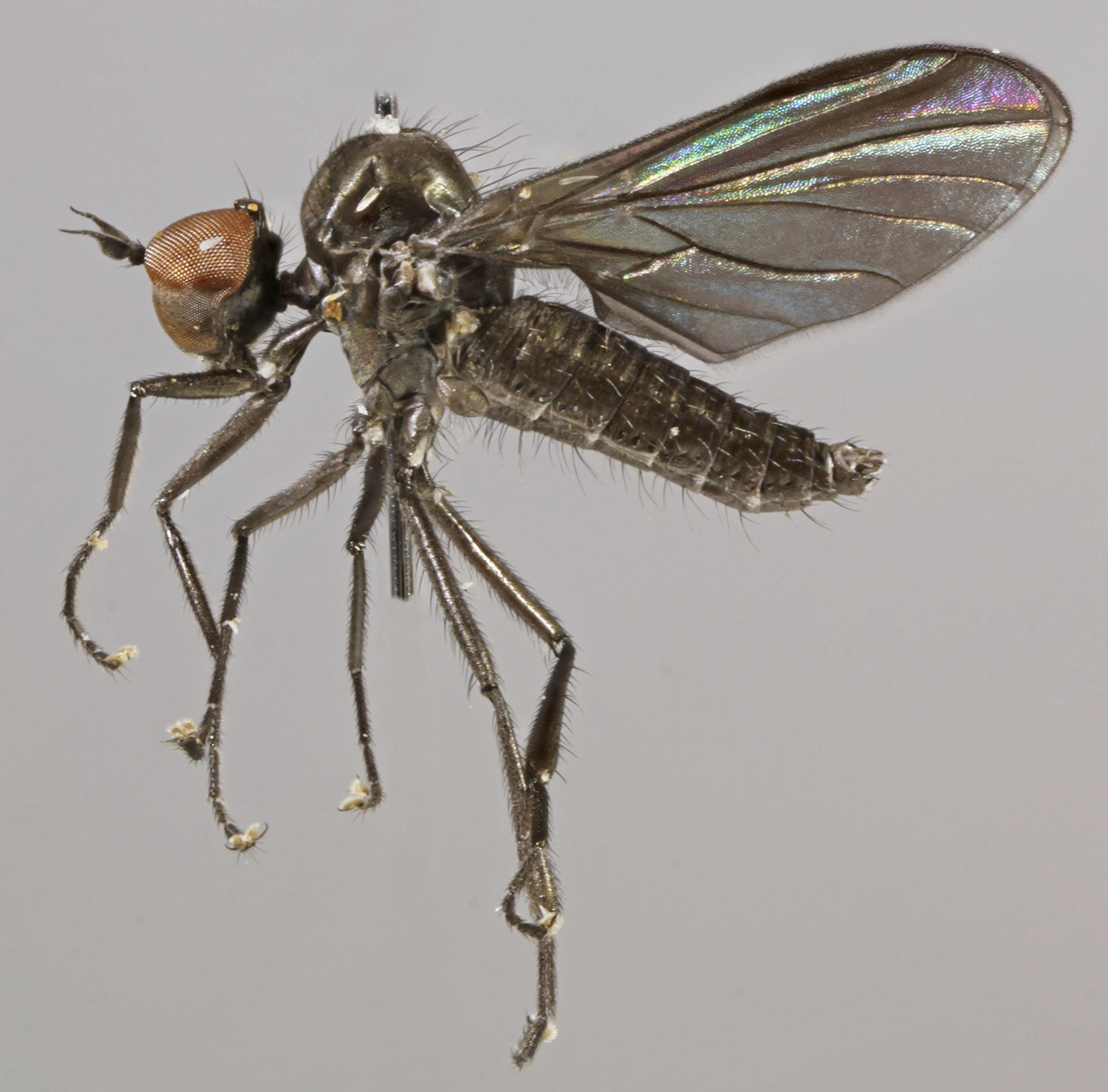
- Bicellaria vana

Scientific classification
- Domain: Eukaryota
- Kingdom: Animalia
- Phylum: Arthropoda
- Class: Insecta
- Order: Diptera
- Family: Hybotidae
- Subfamily: Ocydromiinae
- Tribe: Bicellariini; Sinclair & Cumming, 2006

= Bicellariini =

Tribe of flies

Bicellariini is a tribe of hybotid flies.

== Genera ==
- Bicellaria Macquart, 1823
- Hoplocyrtoma Melander, 1928
- Leptocyrtoma Saigusa, 1986
