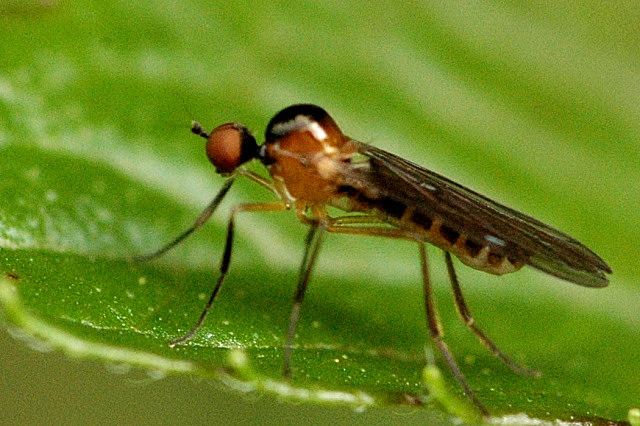
- Ocydromia glabricula

Scientific classification
- Kingdom: Animalia
- Phylum: Arthropoda
- Clade: Pancrustacea
- Class: Insecta
- Order: Diptera
- Family: Hybotidae
- Subfamily: Ocydromiinae; Schiner, 1862

= Ocydromiinae =

Subfamily of flies

Ocydromiinae is a subfamily of hybotid flies.

== Tribes ==
Bicellaria sp.

- Tribe Bicellariini Sinclair & Cumming, 2006
  - Genus Bicellaria Macquart, 1823
  - Genus Hoplocyrtoma Melander, 1928
  - Genus Leptocyrtoma Saigusa, 1986
- Tribe Ocydromiini
  - Genus Abocciputa Plant, 1989
  - Genus Apterodromia Oldroyd, 1949
  - Genus Austropeza Plant, 1989
  - Genus Hoplopeza Bezzi, 1909
  - Genus Leptodromiella Tuomikoski, 1936
  - Genus Leptodromia Sinclair & Cumming, 2000
  - Genus Leptopeza Macquart, 1834
  - Genus Neotrichina Cumming, 2000
  - Genus Ocydromia Meigen, 1820
  - Genus Oropezella Collin, 1926
  - Genus Pseudoscelolabes Collin, 1933
  - Genus Scelolabes Philippi, 1865
  - Genus Stylocydromia Saigusa, 1986
