= List of Syneches species =

This is a list of 165 species in Syneches, a genus of hybotid dance flies in the family Hybotidae.

== Syneches species ==
- Syneches acutatus Saigusa & Yang, 2003
- Syneches albonotatus Loew, 1862
- Syneches amamiensis Saigusa, 1964
- Syneches amazonicus Menzes & Ale-Rocha, 2016
- Syneches amorimi Soares, Freitas-Silva & Ale-Rocha, 2021
- Syneches ancistroides Li, Zhang & Yang, 2007
- Syneches angulatus Menzes & Ale-Rocha, 2016
- Syneches annulipes Bezzi, 1909
- Syneches apiciflavus Yang, Yang & Hu, 2002
- Syneches applanatus Menzes & Ale-Rocha, 2016
- Syneches armatus Melander, 1928
- Syneches astigma Wang, Wang & Yang, 2014
- Syneches ater Melander, 1928
- Syneches atratus Soares & Ale-Rocha, 2018
- Syneches bakeri Melander, 1928
- Syneches baotianmana Yang, Wang, Zhu & Zhang, 2010
- Syneches barrettoi Soares, Freitas-Silva & Ale-Rocha, 2021
- Syneches barypterus Melander, 1928
- Syneches basiniger Yang & Wang, 1998
- Syneches bicolor (Walker, 1859)
- Syneches bicornutus Yang & Yang, 2004
- Syneches bigoti Bezzi, 1904
- Syneches bilobatus Menzes & Ale-Rocha, 2016
- Syneches boettcheri Frey, 1938
- Syneches brevispinus Collin, 1929
- Syneches brunettii Smith, 1975
- Syneches calodromius Frey, 1938
- Syneches capensis Smith, 1969
- Syneches catarinae Smith, 1962
- Syneches claripilosus Saigusa, 1964
- Syneches curvineura Melander, 1928
- Syneches curvipes (Fabricius, 1805)
- Syneches debilis Coquillett, 1895
- Syneches deficiens (Walker, 1859)
- Syneches deformitarsis Saigusa, 1964
- Syneches devius Collin, 1929
- Syneches dichaetophorus Bezzi, 1904
- Syneches dichogenus Melander, 1928
- Syneches dichrous Bezzi, 1909
- Syneches digitatus Soares, Freitas-Silva & Ale-Rocha, 2021
- Syneches dinoscelis Bezzi, 1904
- Syneches distinctus Wang, Wang & Yang, 2014
- Syneches dominicanus Ale-Rocha & Rafael, 2004
- Syneches duplex Melander, 1928
- Syneches elegans Frey, 1938
- Syneches elevatus Bezzi, 1908
- Syneches equatoriensis Menzes & Ale-Rocha, 2016
- Syneches eustylatus (Bigot, 1889)
- Syneches exilis Menzes & Ale-Rocha, 2016
- Syneches fasciatus Soares, Freitas-Silva & Ale-Rocha, 2021
- Syneches ferrugineus (Walker, 1860)
- Syneches fijiensis Yang & Yao, 2007
- Syneches flavicoxa Wang, Wang & Yang, 2014
- Syneches flavipalpis Saigusa, 1964
- Syneches flavipes (Brunetti, 1913)
- Syneches flaviscutellatus Soares, Freitas-Silva & Ale-Rocha, 2021
- Syneches flavithorax Ale-Rocha, 2016
- Syneches flavitibia Wang, Wang & Yang, 2014
- Syneches fratellus Brunetti, 1913
- Syneches frosti Wilder, 1974
- Syneches fujianesis Yang & Yang, 2003
- Syneches fuliginosus Meijere, 1916
- Syneches furcatus Saigusa & Yang, 2003
- Syneches fuscescens Bezzi, 1909
- Syneches fuscipennis (Brunetti, 1913)
- Syneches fuscus Soares, Freitas-Silva & Ale-Rocha, 2021
- Syneches graminis Smith, 1969
- Syneches grandis Frey, 1953
- Syneches guangdongensis Yang & Grootaert, 2004
- Syneches guangxiensis Yang, 2007
- Syneches guizhouensis Yang & Yang, 1988
- Syneches handschini Frey, 1938
- Syneches helvolus Frey, 1917
- Syneches henanensis (Saigusa & Yang, 2003)
- Syneches hirashimai Saigusa, 1990
- Syneches hispidus Ale-Rocha & Vieira, 2008
- Syneches hyalinus Coquillett, 1895
- Syneches hyalopterus Bezzi, 1904
- Syneches immaculatus Brunetti, 1913
- Syneches indistinctus Wang, Wang & Yang, 2014
- Syneches inversus Curran, 1928
- Syneches jamaicensis Wilder, 1974
- Syneches jardinei Senior-White, 1924
- Syneches jauensis Ale-Rocha & Vieira, 2008
- Syneches lachaisei Charbonnel, 1998
- Syneches latus Yang & Grootaert, 2004
- Syneches leonensis Raffone, 1994
- Syneches lii Yang, Wang, Zhu & Zhang, 2010
- Syneches limaeirai Soares & Ale-Rocha, 2018
- Syneches lividus Melander, 1928
- Syneches loici Charbonnel & Daugeron, 2000
- Syneches longiflagellatus Ale-Rocha & Vieira, 2008
- Syneches longipennis Melander, 1902
- Syneches longistigma Frey, 1938
- Syneches longiventris Melander, 1928
- Syneches luanchuanensis Yang & Wang, 1998
- Syneches luctifer Bezzi, 1912
- Syneches luzonicus Frey, 1938
- Syneches macrochaetosus Wilder, 1974
- Syneches macrothele Smith, 1969
- Syneches maculatus (Matsumura, 1916)
- Syneches maculithorax Senior-White, 1924
- Syneches maculosum Menzes & Ale-Rocha, 2016
- Syneches mamillosus Smith, 1969
- Syneches manaos Smith, 1962
- Syneches maoershanensis Yang, 2007
- Syneches mars Garrett Jones, 1940
- Syneches matemus Curran, 1936
- Syneches matilei Charbonnel, 1998
- Syneches medinai Wilder, 1974
- Syneches medoganus Zhao, Ding, Lin & Yang, 2020
- Syneches minor Bezzi, 1904
- Syneches minutus Brunetti, 1913
- Syneches miyamotoi Saigusa, 1964
- Syneches moraballi Smith, 1963
- Syneches muscarius (Fabricius, 1794)
- Syneches nankunshanensis Li, Zhang & Yang, 2007
- Syneches nanlingensis Yang & Grootaert, 2007
- Syneches natalensis (Bigot, 1889)
- Syneches nebulosus Loew, 1858
- Syneches neptunus Garrett Jones, 1940
- Syneches nigrescens Shi, Yao & Yang, 2014
- Syneches nigridus Collin, 1941
- Syneches nigritibia Zhao, Ding, Lin & Yang, 2020
- Syneches nordestino Soares, Freitas-Silva & Ale-Rocha, 2021
- Syneches obeliscus Bezzi, 1909
- Syneches oedicnemus Bezzi, 1928
- Syneches pallidicornis Frey, 1938
- Syneches palliditarsis Brunetti, 1913
- Syneches pallidus Wilder, 1974
- Syneches peradeniyae Senior-White, 1924
- Syneches periscelis Melander, 1928
- Syneches phaeopterus Bezzi, 1905
- Syneches planiceps Melander, 1928
- Syneches platybregmus Quate, 1960
- Syneches plaumanni Soares, Freitas-Silva & Ale-Rocha, 2021
- Syneches polleti Ale-Rocha, 2016
- Syneches praestans Bezzi, 1912
- Syneches primissimus Garrett Jones, 1940
- Syneches pulliginis Collin, 1941
- Syneches pullus Bezzi, 1912
- Syneches pusillus Loew, 1861
- Syneches pyramidatus Bezzi, 1905
- Syneches quadraginta Garrett Jones, 1940
- Syneches quadrangularis Wheeler & Melander, 1901
- Syneches rafaeli Ale-Rocha & Vieira, 2008
- Syneches repletus Bezzi, 1909
- Syneches ruficollis (Walker, 1852)
- Syneches rufitibia Frey, 1953
- Syneches rufus Loew, 1861
- Syneches rusticus Brunetti, 1913
- Syneches semibrunnea Meijere, 1911
- Syneches semihelvolus Frey, 1938
- Syneches serratus Yang, An & Gao, 2002
- Syneches shirozui Saigusa, 1963
- Syneches shumuyuanensis Li, Zhang & Yang, 2007
- Syneches signatus (Bigot, 1859)
- Syneches simplex Walker, 1852
- Syneches sinclairi Soares, Freitas-Silva & Ale-Rocha, 2021
- Syneches singularis Yang & Yang, 2004
- Syneches smithi Soares, Freitas-Silva & Ale-Rocha, 2021
- Syneches spinidorsum Bezzi, 1928
- Syneches stigma (Walker, 1865)
- Syneches stigmaticalis Bezzi, 1909
- Syneches striatus Menzes & Ale-Rocha, 2016
- Syneches subdeficiens Frey, 1938
- Syneches sublatus Yang & Grootaert, 2007
- Syneches subvittatus Yang & Yao, 2007
- Syneches tenebricus Menzes & Ale-Rocha, 2016
- Syneches thoracicus (Say, 1823)
- Syneches tibetanus Yang & Yang, 1988
- Syneches tomentosus Smith, 1962
- Syneches tuberculitibia Smith, 1969
- Syneches usherae Smith, 1969
- Syneches varipes (Senior-White, 1924)
- Syneches varus Melander, 1928
- Syneches velutinus Meijere, 1906
- Syneches vidali Ale-Rocha & Vieira, 2008
- Syneches vineus Wilder, 1974
- Syneches visinonii Raffone, 2005
- Syneches vittatus (Walker, 1860)
- Syneches vittipleura Frey, 1938
- Syneches walkeri Smith, 1962
- Syneches wangae Wang, Wang & Yang, 2014
- Syneches xanthochromus Yang & Yang, 1988
- Syneches xiaohuangshanensis Yang & Grootaert, 2007
- Syneches xui Yang & Grootaert, 2004
- Syneches zhejiangensis Yang & Wang, 1998
