= Syneches thoracicus =

Scientific classification
- Kingdom: Animalia
- Phylum: Arthropoda
- Class: Insecta
- Order: Diptera
- Family: Hybotidae
- Subfamily: Hybotinae
- Genus: Syneches
- Species: S. thoracicus

Binomial name
- Syneches thoracicus (Say, 1823)

Synonyms
- Hybos thoracicus Say, 1823; Gloma phthia Walker, 1849; Syneches testaceus Melander, 1928

Species of fly

Syneches thoracicus is a species of hybotid dance fly in the family Hybotidae.

== Distribution ==
Canada, United States.
