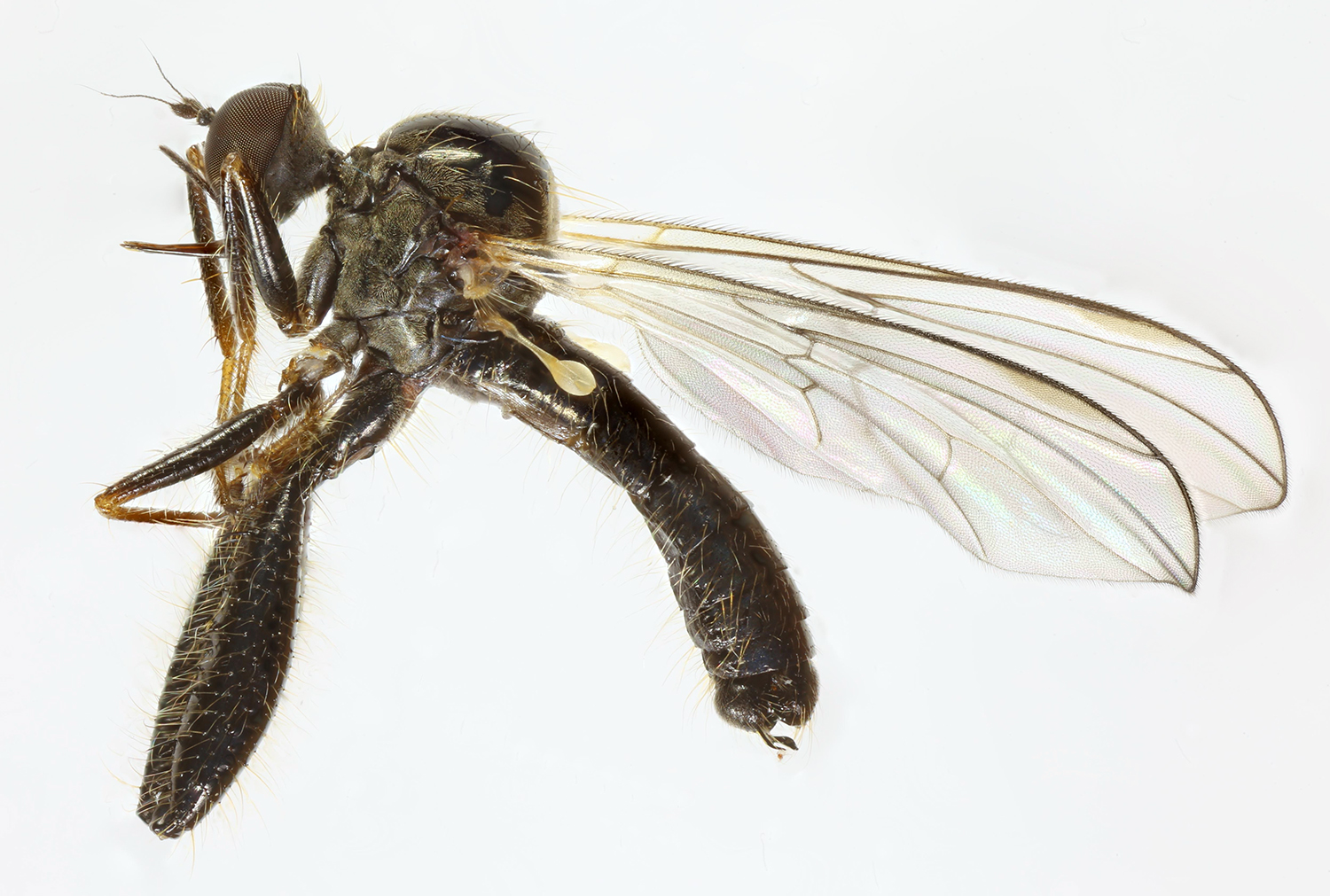
- Hybos femoratus North Wales

Scientific classification
- Kingdom: Animalia
- Phylum: Arthropoda
- Class: Insecta
- Order: Diptera
- Family: Hybotidae
- Subfamily: Hybotinae
- Genus: Hybos
- Species: H. femoratus

Binomial name
- Hybos femoratus (Müller, 1776)

Synonyms
- Asilus femoratus Müller, 1776; Hybos flavipes Meigen, 1804; Hybos fumipennis Meigen & Wiedemann, 1820

= Hybos femoratus =

Species of fly

Hybos femoratus is a species of fly in the family Hybotidae. It is found in the Palearctic.
