= Syneches pusillus =

Scientific classification
- Kingdom: Animalia
- Phylum: Arthropoda
- Class: Insecta
- Order: Diptera
- Family: Hybotidae
- Subfamily: Hybotinae
- Genus: Syneches
- Species: S. pusillus

Binomial name
- Syneches pusillus Loew, 1861

Species of fly

Syneches pusillus is a species of hybotid dance fly in the family Hybotidae.

== Distribution ==
United States, Panama, West Indies.
