= Syneches ater =

Scientific classification
- Kingdom: Animalia
- Phylum: Arthropoda
- Class: Insecta
- Order: Diptera
- Family: Hybotidae
- Subfamily: Hybotinae
- Genus: Syneches
- Species: S. ater

Binomial name
- Syneches ater Melander, 1928

Species of fly

Syneches ater is a species of hybotid dance fly in the family Hybotidae.

== Distribution ==
United States.
