= Afrohybos =

Scientific classification
- Kingdom: Animalia
- Phylum: Arthropoda
- Class: Insecta
- Order: Diptera
- Family: Hybotidae
- Subfamily: Hybotinae
- Genus: Afrohybos; Smith, 1969

Type species
- Afrohybos valentinus Smith, 1969

Genus of flies

Afrohybos is a genus of flies in the family Hybotidae.

== Species ==
- Afrohybos valentinus Smith, 1969
