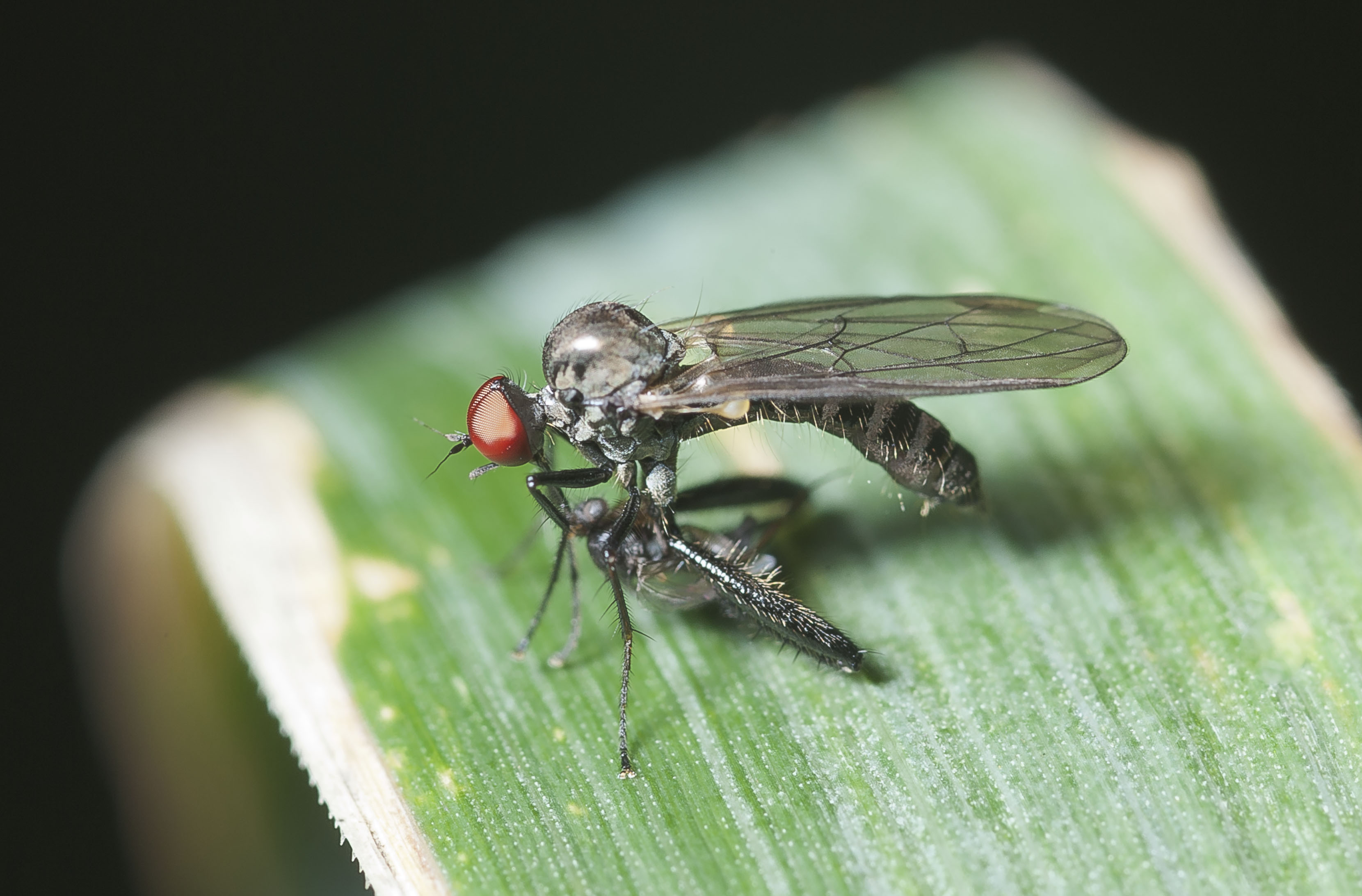

Scientific classification
- Kingdom: Animalia
- Phylum: Arthropoda
- Clade: Pancrustacea
- Class: Insecta
- Order: Diptera
- Family: Hybotidae
- Subfamily: Hybotinae
- Genus: Hybos
- Species: H. culiciformis

Binomial name
- Hybos culiciformis (Fabricius, 1775)

Synonyms
- Asilus culiciformis Fabricius, 1775; Hybos vitripennis Meigen, 1820; Hybos rufitarsis Roser, 1840; Hybos infuscatus Zetterstedt, 1842; Hybos rufitarsis Zetterstedt, 1849

= Hybos culiciformis =

Species of fly

Hybos culiciformis, common name dance fly, is a species of fly belonging to the family hybotid.

== Description ==
Hybos culiciformis can reach a size of 3.5 to 5.5 mm. It has large yellowish thoracic setae, row of setae on the mid femur and strong setae on mid tibiae. Mesonotum is finely dusted. It flies from June to September and feeds on small insects.

== Distribution and habitat ==
This species is widespread in Europe and in the Near East. It can be found in woodland edges and on hedgerows.

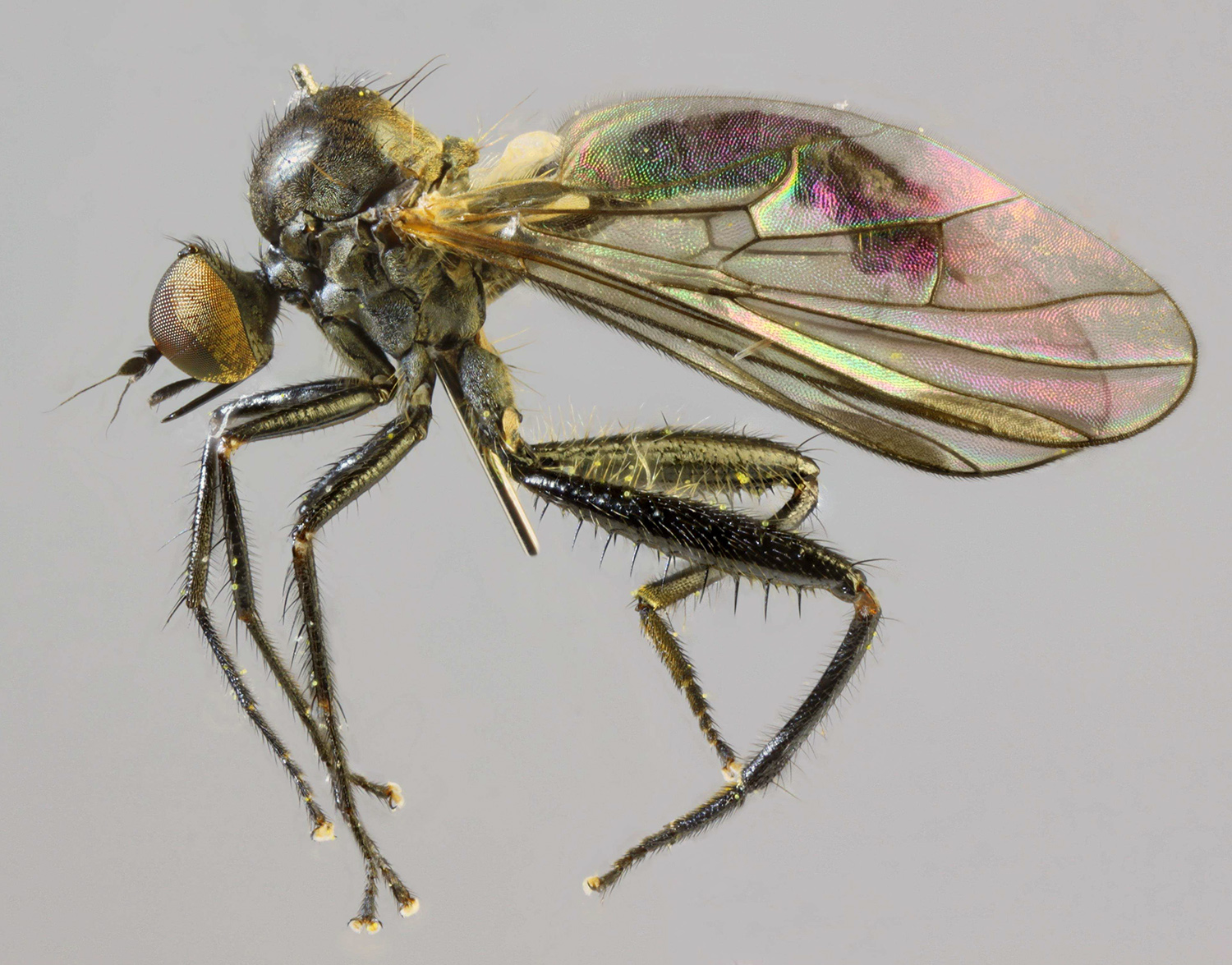

Hybos culiciformis with prey (video)
