= Acarterus =

Scientific classification
- Kingdom: Animalia
- Phylum: Arthropoda
- Class: Insecta
- Order: Diptera
- Family: Hybotidae
- Subfamily: Hybotinae
- Genus: Acarterus; Loew, 1858

Type species
- Acarterus unicolor Loew, 1858

Genus of flies

Acarterus is a genus of flies in the family Hybotidae.

== Species ==
- Acarterus apicalis Sinclair, 1996
- Acarterus darwini Sinclair, 1996
- Acarterus londti Sinclair, 1996
- Acarterus macrochaetus Sinclair, 1996
- Acarterus nigricans Sinclair, 1996
- Acarterus pallidus Sinclair, 1996
- Acarterus stuckenbergi Sinclair, 1996
- Acarterus unicolor Loew, 1858
