= Smithybos =

Scientific classification
- Kingdom: Animalia
- Phylum: Arthropoda
- Class: Insecta
- Order: Diptera
- Family: Hybotidae
- Subfamily: Hybotinae
- Genus: Smithybos; Ale-Rocha, 2000

Type species
- Smithybos equatoriensis Ale-Rocha, 2000

Genus of flies

Smithybos is a genus of flies in the family Hybotidae.

== Species ==
- Smithybos equatoriensis Ale-Rocha, 2000
