= Parahybos =

Scientific classification
- Kingdom: Animalia
- Phylum: Arthropoda
- Class: Insecta
- Order: Diptera
- Family: Hybotidae
- Subfamily: Hybotinae
- Genus: Parahybos; Kertész, 1899

Type species
- Parahybos iridipennis Kertész, 1899

Genus of flies

Parahybos is a genus of flies in the family Hybotidae.

== Species ==
- Parahybos breviprocerus Li, Zhang & Yang, 2014
- Parahybos chaetoproctus Bezzi, 1907
- Parahybos chiragra Bezzi, 1912
- Parahybos concolorus Yang & Yang, 1993
- Parahybos horni (Frey, 1938)
- Parahybos incertus Bezzi, 1912
- Parahybos infuscatus Meijere, 1911
- Parahybos iridipennis Kertész, 1899
- Parahybos kongmingshanensis Yang & Yang, 2004
- Parahybos longipilosus Yang & Yang, 2004
- Parahybos longiprocerus Li, Zhang & Yang, 2014
- Parahybos luteicornis (Frey, 1917)
- Parahybos melas Bezzi, 1912
- Parahybos nanpingensis Yang & Yang, 2004
- Parahybos orientalis (Meijere, 1907)
- Parahybos ornatipes Meijere, 1914
- Parahybos pallipes (Bezzi, 1904)
- Parahybos pusillus Meijere, 1911
- Parahybos sauteri Bezzi, 1912
- Parahybos simplicipes Bezzi, 1912
- Parahybos sinensis Yang & Yang, 1993
- Parahybos zhejiangensis Yang & Yang, 1995
