= Chillcottomyia =

Scientific classification
- Kingdom: Animalia
- Phylum: Arthropoda
- Class: Insecta
- Order: Diptera
- Family: Hybotidae
- Subfamily: Hybotinae
- Genus: Chillcottomyia; Saigusa, 1986

Type species
- Chillcottomyia septentrionalis Saigusa, 1986

Genus of flies

Chillcottomyia is a genus of flies in the family Hybotidae.

== Species ==
- Chillcottomyia biseta Yang & Yang, 2004
- Chillcottomyia septentrionalis Saigusa, 1986
- Chillcottomyia shimentaiensis Yang & Grootaert, 2004
- Chillcottomyia zhuae Yang, 2006
