= Stenoproctus =

Scientific classification
- Kingdom: Animalia
- Phylum: Arthropoda
- Clade: Pancrustacea
- Class: Insecta
- Order: Diptera
- Family: Hybotidae
- Subfamily: Hybotinae
- Genus: Stenoproctus; Loew, 1858

Type species
- Stenoproctus unipunctatus Loew, 1858

Synonyms
- Acanthopeza Becker, 1914

Genus of flies

Stenoproctus is a genus of flies in the family Hybotidae.

== Species ==
- Stenoproctus africanus Smith, 1969
- Stenoproctus chakai Smith, 1969
- Stenoproctus cooksoni Smith, 1969
- Stenoproctus divergens Smith, 1969
- Stenoproctus kilimanjaroensis Smith, 1967
- Stenoproctus loewi Smith, 1969
- Stenoproctus maximus Garrett Jones, 1940
- Stenoproctus naivasha Smith, 1969
- Stenoproctus nepalensis Smith, 1965
- Stenoproctus palpatus Smith, 1969
- Stenoproctus securus Garrett Jones, 1940
- Stenoproctus serus Garrett Jones, 1940
- Stenoproctus similis Smith, 1969
- Stenoproctus sylvaticus (Becker, 1914)
- Stenoproctus unipunctatus Loew, 1858
- Stenoproctus venaticus Smith, 1969
