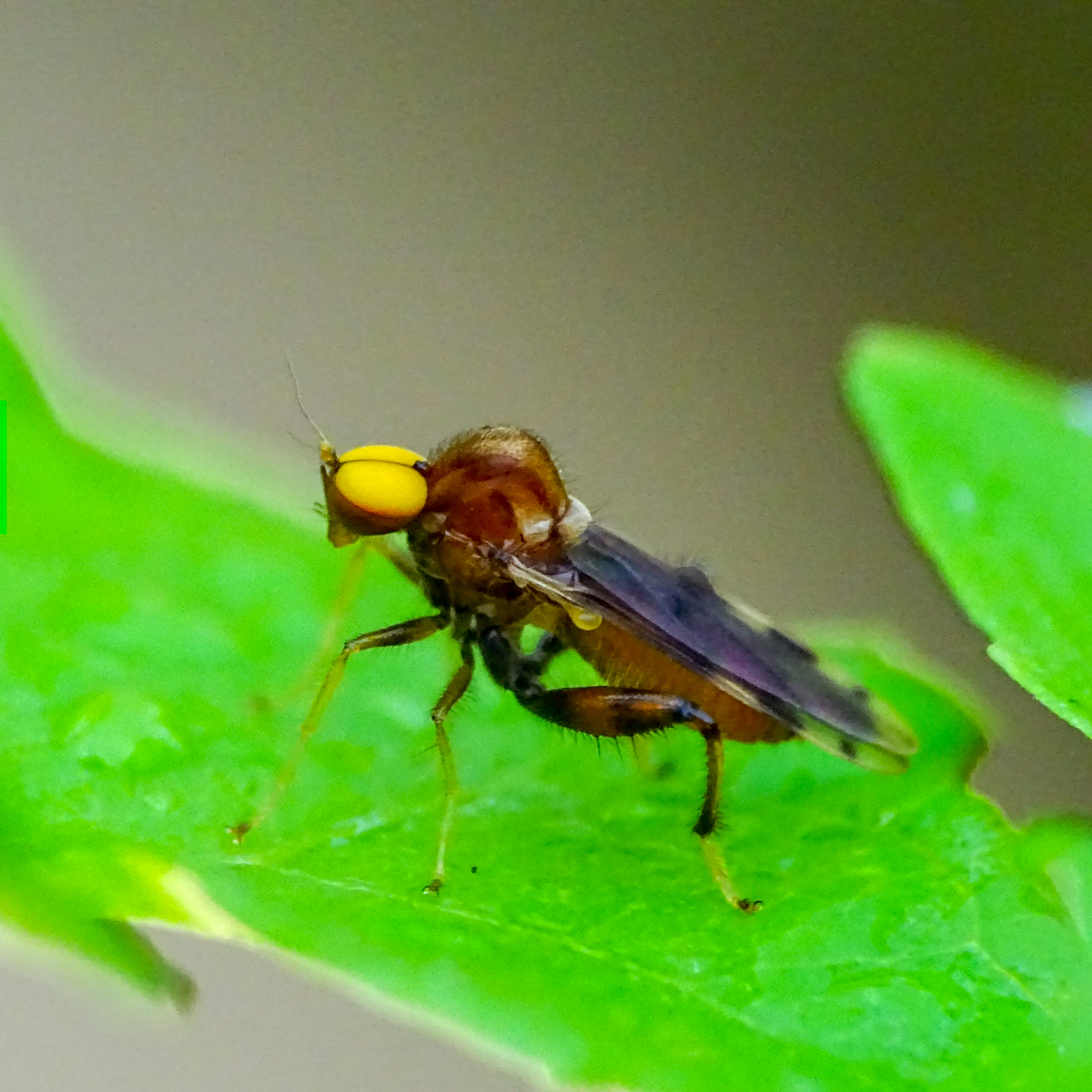

Scientific classification
- Kingdom: Animalia
- Phylum: Arthropoda
- Class: Insecta
- Order: Diptera
- Family: Hybotidae
- Subfamily: Hybotinae
- Genus: Syndyas; Loew, 1857

Type species
- Syndyas opaca Loew, 1858

Synonyms
- Sabinios Garrett-Jones, 1940

= Syndyas =

Genus of flies

Syndyas is a genus of flies belonging to the family Hybotidae.

The species of this genus are found in Europe, Asia, Africa and North America.

== Species ==
- Syndyas albipila Smith, 1969
- Syndyas amazonica Ale-Rocha, 1999
- Syndyas aterrima Meijere, 1913
- Syndyas austropolita Teskey & Chillcott, 1977
- Syndyas brevior Meijere, 1910
- Syndyas crisis Jones, 1940
- Syndyas dapana Frey, 1938
- Syndyas dorsalis Loew, 1861
- Syndyas elongata Meijere, 1910
- Syndyas eumera Bezzi, 1904
- Syndyas indumeni Smith, 1969
- Syndyas jonesi (Smith, 1969)
- Syndyas jovis (Jones, 1940)
- Syndyas lamborni (Smith, 1969)
- Syndyas lilani Smith, 1969
- Syndyas lustricola Teskey & Chillcott, 1977
- Syndyas melanderi Ale-Rocha, 2008
- Syndyas merbleuensis Teskey & Chillcott, 1977
- Syndyas merzi Shamshev & Grootaert, 2012
- Syndyas minor Jones, 1940
- Syndyas nigripes (Zetterstedt, 1842)
- Syndyas nitida Loew, 1858
- Syndyas opaca Loew, 1858
- Syndyas orientalis Frey, 1938
- Syndyas parvicellulata Bezzi, 1904
- Syndyas pictipennis Jones, 1940
- Syndyas pleuripolita Teskey & Chillcott, 1977
- Syndyas polita Loew, 1861
- Syndyas selinda Smith, 1969
- Syndyas sinensis Yang & Yang, 1995
- Syndyas sola Jones, 1940
- Syndyas subsavinios Chvála, 1975
- Syndyas tajikistanica Shamshev & Grootaert, 2012
- Syndyas tomentosa Smith, 1969
- Syndyas vitripennis (Brunetti, 1913)
- Syndyas yunmengshanensis Yang, 2004
