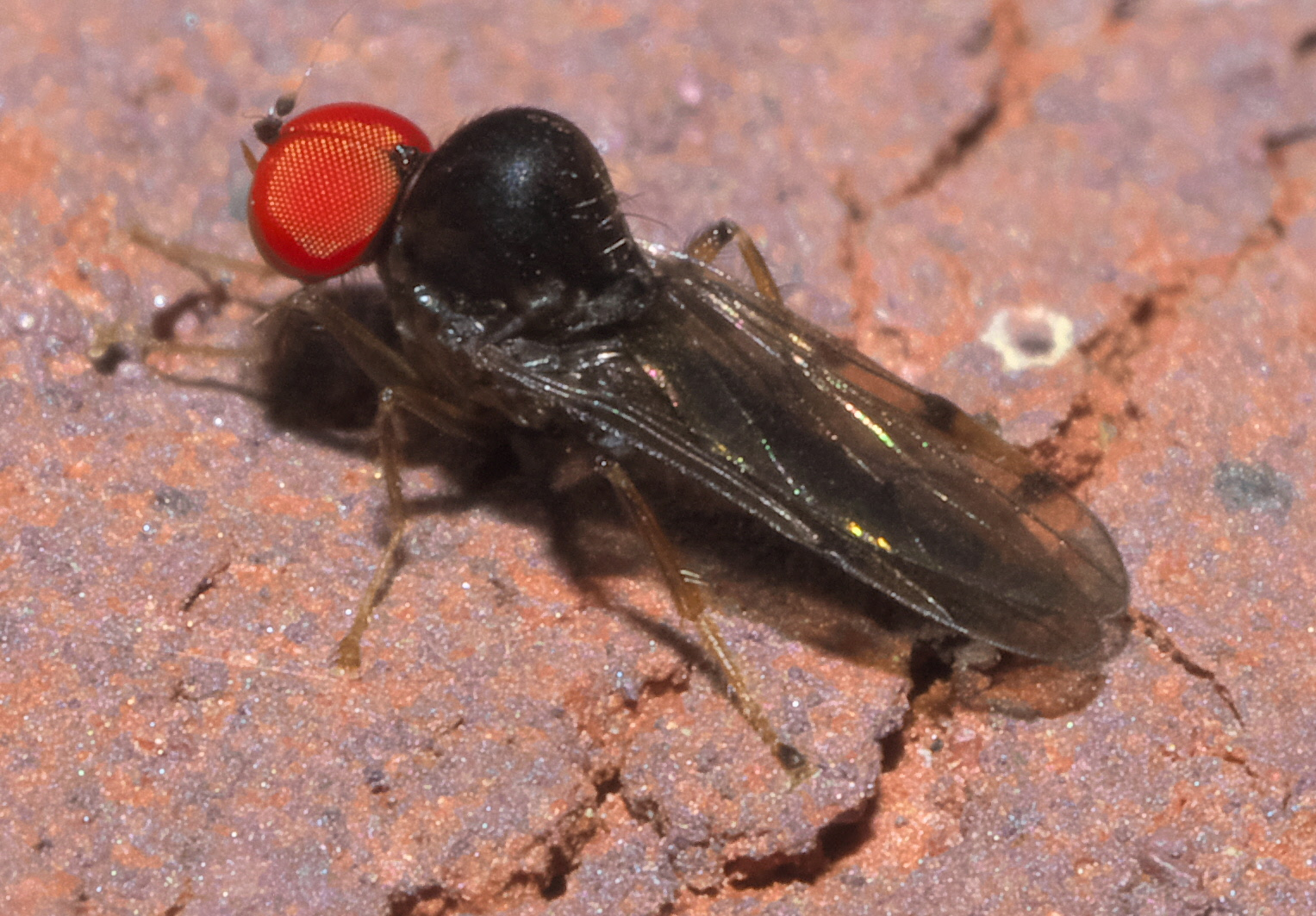

Scientific classification
- Kingdom: Animalia
- Phylum: Arthropoda
- Class: Insecta
- Order: Diptera
- Family: Hybotidae
- Subfamily: Hybotinae
- Genus: Syneches
- Species: S. simplex

Binomial name
- Syneches simplex Walker, 1852

Synonyms
- Hybos elevatus Harris, 1835

= Syneches simplex =

Species of fly

Syneches simplex is a species of hybotid dance fly in the family Hybotidae.

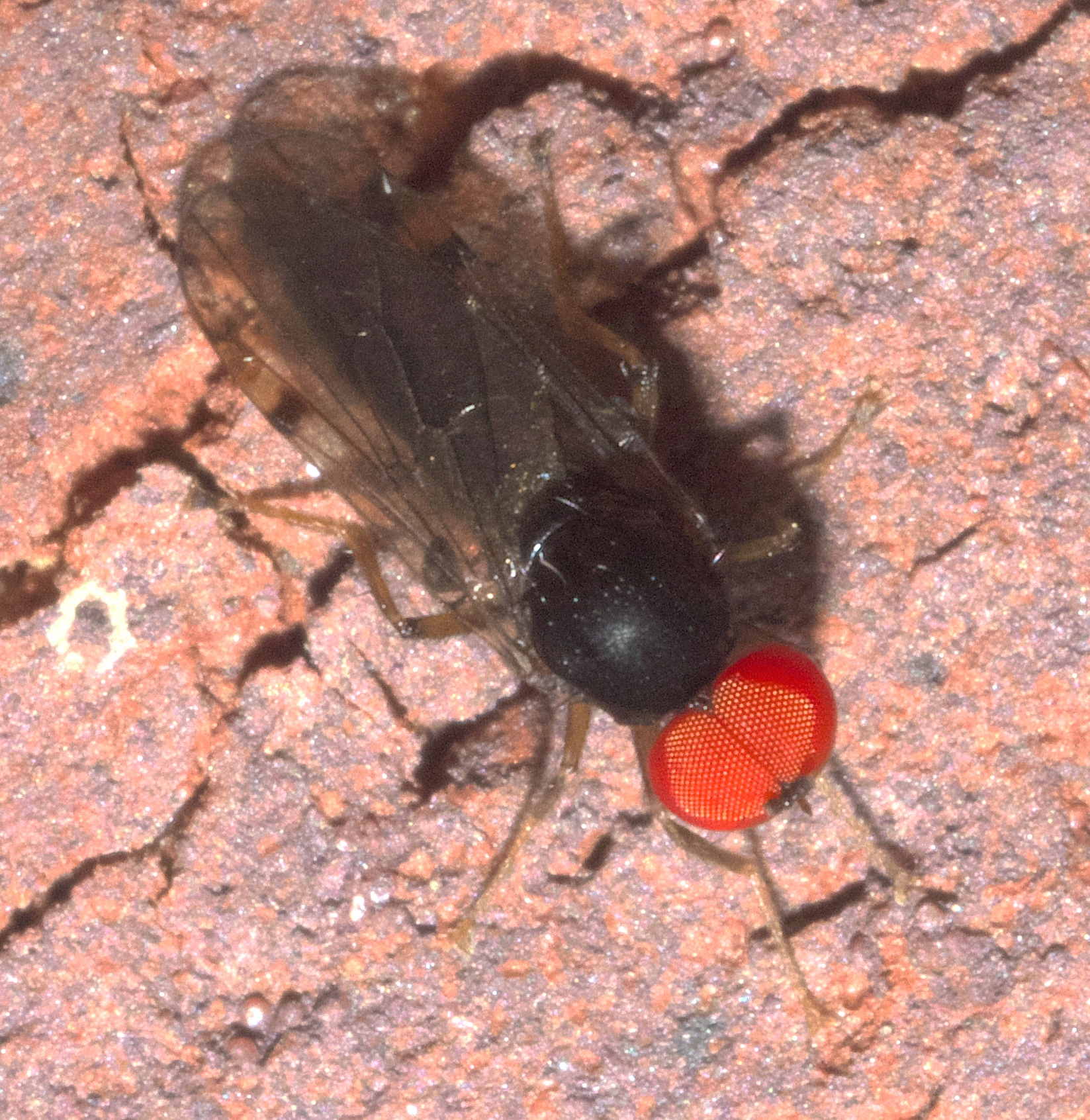

== Distribution ==
Canada, United States.
