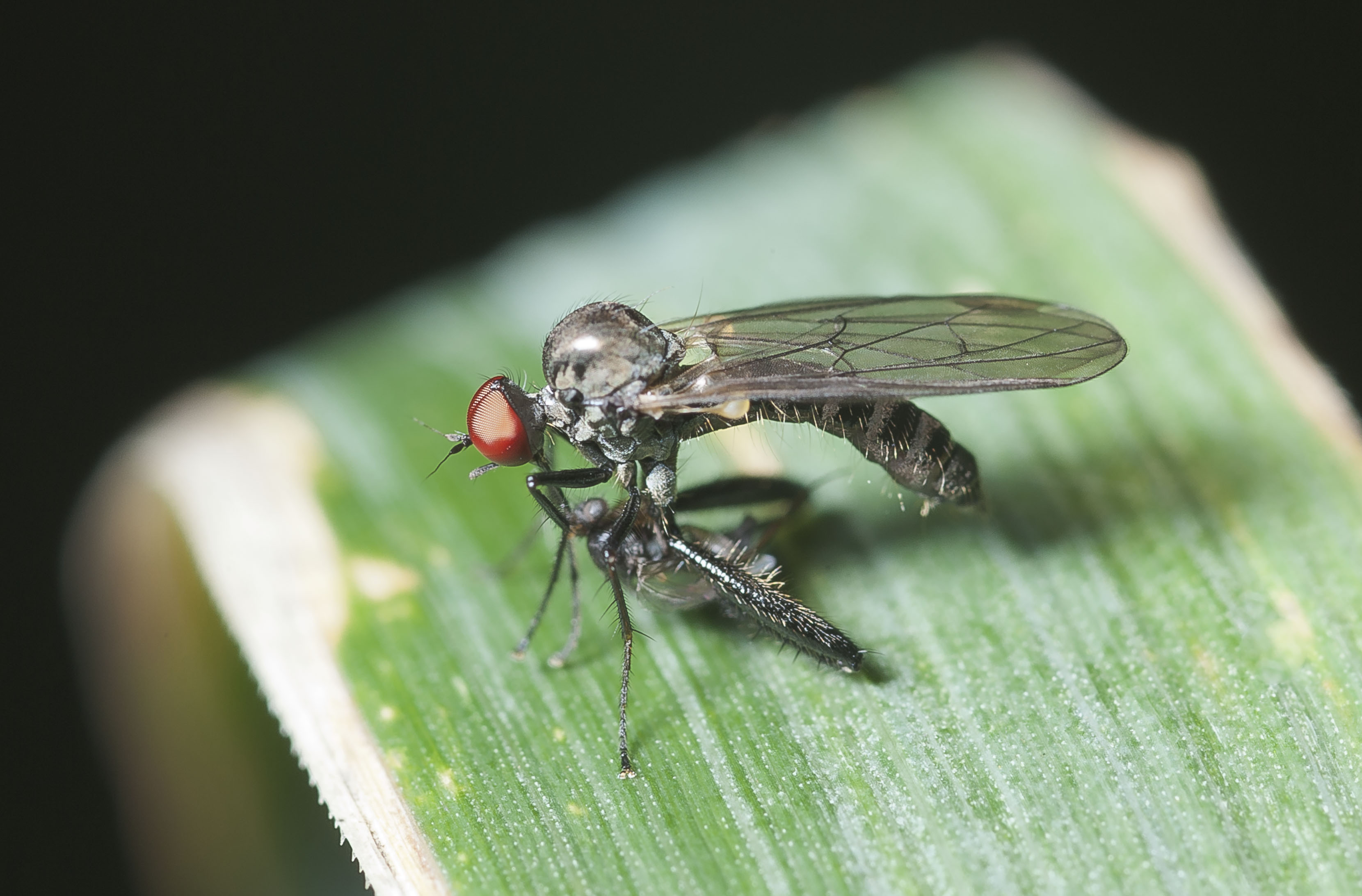
- Hybos culiciformis

Scientific classification
- Kingdom: Animalia
- Phylum: Arthropoda
- Class: Insecta
- Order: Diptera
- Family: Hybotidae
- Subfamily: Hybotinae
- Genus: Hybos; Meigen, 1803

Type species
- Hybos funebris Meigen, 1804

Synonyms
- Noeza Meigen, 1800

= Hybos =

Genus of flies

Hybos is a genus of hybotid flies.

== Species ==
Hybos femoratus with prey

- Hybos aceriformis Plant, 2013
- Hybos acutatus Yang & Yang, 1986
- Hybos aimai Smith, 1965
- Hybos alamaculatus Yang & Yang, 1995
- Hybos anae Yang & Yang, 2004
- Hybos ancistroides Yang & Yang, 1986
- Hybos ancyclochiles Plant, 2013
- Hybos andradei Shamshev, Grootaert & Kustov, 2015
- Hybos anisoserratus Plant, 2013
- Hybos annulipes Frey, 1953
- Hybos apicalis Frey, 1953
- Hybos apiciacutatus Yang & Yang, 2004
- Hybos apiciflavus Yang & Yang, 1995
- Hybos apicihamatus Yang & Yang, 1995
- Hybos apicis Brunetti, 1913
- Hybos arctus Yang & Yang, 1988
- Hybos aurifer Saigusa, 1963
- Hybos auripes Brunetti, 1913
- Hybos baiyunshanensis Saigusa & Yang, 2003
- Hybos basiflavus Yang & Yang, 1986
- Hybos bawanlingensis Yang, 2008
- Hybos beibenganus Wang & Yang, 2014
- Hybos bezzii Kertész, 1899
- Hybos bhainse Smith, 1965
- Hybos biancistroides Yang & Li, 2011
- Hybos bicoloripes Saigusa, 1963
- Hybos bifurcatus Yang & Grootaert, 2006
- Hybos bigeniculatus Yang & Yang, 1991
- Hybos bilobatus Shi, Yang & Grootaert, 2009
- Hybos biseta Hybos, 2017
- Hybos bisetosus Bezzi, 1904
- Hybos bispinatus Plant, 2013
- Hybos bispinipes Saigusa, 1965
- Hybos brachialis Rondani, 1875
- Hybos brachystigma Bezzi, 1904
- Hybos brevifurvatus Wang & Yang, 2014
- Hybos brevis Yang & Yang, 1995
- Hybos brunnipes Brunetti, 1913
- Hybos caesariatus Yang & Yang, 2004
- Hybos changbaishanus Wei, Wang, Kwon & Yang, 2016
- Hybos chaweewani Plant, 2013
- Hybos chinensis Frey, 1953
- Hybos concavus Yang & Yang, 1991
- Hybos coniatus Melander, 1928
- Hybos conicus Grootaert & Barták, 2021
- Hybos constrictus Shi, Yang & Grootaert, 2009
- Hybos crassatus Saigusa & Yang, 2003
- Hybos crassisetosus Yang & Yang, 2004
- Hybos culiciformis (Fabricius, 1775)
- Hybos curvatus Yang & Grootaert, 2005
- Hybos curvinervatus Yang & Yang, 1988
- Hybos curvus Wang & Yang, 2014
- Hybos daqinggouensis Wang, Dong & Yang, 2015
- Hybos daugeroni Plant, 2013
- Hybos dentipes Wiedemann, 1828
- Hybos didymus Yang & Yang, 2004
- Hybos digitiformis Yang & Yang, 1988
- Hybos discoidalis Meijere, 1914
- Hybos dissonus Ale-Rocha, 2001
- Hybos divisus Plant, 2013
- Hybos dnopheros Quate, 1960
- Hybos dorsalis Yang & Yang, 1995
- Hybos ectorus Melander, 1928
- Hybos elongatus Li, Wang & Yang, 2014
- Hybos emishanus Yang & Yang, 1989
- Hybos ensatus Yang & Yang, 1986
- Hybos exilis Meunier, 1908
- Hybos facetus Ale-Rocha, 2001
- Hybos fanjingshanensis Yang & Yang, 2004
- Hybos femoratus (Müller, 1776)
- Hybos flavicoxa Frey, 1953
- Hybos flavifemur Li, Noor, Lin & Yang, 2022
- Hybos flavipalpis Brunetti, 1913
- Hybos flaviscutellum Yang & Yang, 1986
- Hybos flavitibialis Li, Wang & Yang, 2014
- Hybos furcatus Yang & Yang, 1988
- Hybos fuscus Ale-Rocha, 2001
- Hybos gagatinus Bigot, 1889
- Hybos gansuensis Yang & Yang, 1988
- Hybos gaoae Yang & Yang, 2004
- Hybos geniculatus Wulp, 1897
- Hybos gongshanus Li, Noor, Lin & Yang, 2022
- Hybos griseus Yang & Yang, 1991
- Hybos grootaerti Plant, 2013
- Hybos grossipes (Linnaeus, 1767)
- Hybos guangdongensis Liu, Yang & Grootaert, 2004
- Hybos guangxiensis Yang & Yang, 1986
- Hybos guanmenshanus Huo, Zhang & Yang, 2010
- Hybos guanxianus Yang & Yang, 1989
- Hybos guizhouensis Yang & Yang, 1988
- Hybos gutianshanus Yang & Yang, 1995
- Hybos hainanensis Yang, 2008
- Hybos hanmianus Wang & Yang, 2014
- Hybos henanensis Yang & Wang, 1998
- Hybos huapingensis Yang & Yang, 2004
- Hybos hubeiensis Yang & Yang, 1991
- Hybos hunanensis Yang & Yang, 1988
- Hybos hylobates Plant, 2013
- Hybos inaequalis (Brunetti, 1913)
- Hybos insignis (Brunetti, 1913)
- Hybos interruptus Saigusa, 1965
- Hybos inthanonensis Plant, 2013
- Hybos japonicus Frey, 1953
- Hybos jianfengensis Yang, Yang & Hu, 2002
- Hybos jiangi Hybos, 2017
- Hybos jianyangensis Yang & Yang, 2004
- Hybos jilinensis Yang & Yang, 1988
- Hybos jingninganus Cao, Yu, Wang & Yang, 2018
- Hybos jinxiuensis Yang & Yang, 1986
- Hybos joneensis Yang & Yang, 1988
- Hybos kaluang Plant, 2013
- Hybos kenyensis Garrett Jones, 1940
- Hybos khamfui Plant, 2013
- Hybos konkaogwang Plant, 2013
- Hybos lannaensis Plant, 2013
- Hybos lateralis Yang & Yang, 1989
- Hybos latus Huo, Zhang & Yang, 2010
- Hybos lihuae Wang & Yang, 2014
- Hybos lii Yang & Yang, 1988
- Hybos liui Yang & Merz, 2004
- Hybos liupanshanus Li & Yang, 2009
- Hybos longipilosus Jiang, Li & Yang, 2011
- Hybos longisetus Yang & Yang, 2004
- Hybos longispina Frey, 1953
- Hybos longshengensis Yang & Yang, 1986
- Hybos longus Yang & Yang, 2004
- Hybos longwanganus Yang & Yang, 2004
- Hybos lugubris Frey, 1953
- Hybos macropygus Frey, 1953
- Hybos major (Bezzi, 1912)
- Hybos mangraii Plant, 2013
- Hybos mangshanensis Yang, Gaimari & Grootaert, 2005
- Hybos maoershanus Yang & Yang, 1995
- Hybos marginatus Yang & Yang, 1989
- Hybos medialis Huo, Grootaert & Yang, 2010
- Hybos mediocris Frey, 1953
- Hybos meeamnat Plant, 2013
- Hybos melanauges Steyskal, 1966
- Hybos mellipes Wheeler & Melander, 1901
- Hybos men Plant, 2013
- Hybos mengqingae Yang & Grootaert, 2006
- Hybos meracrus Steyskal, 1966
- Hybos merzi Plant, 2013
- Hybos mesasiaticus Shamshev, Grootaert & Kustov, 2015
- Hybos minor Frey, 1953
- Hybos minutus Yang & Yang, 1997
- Hybos multisetus Yang & Yang, 2004
- Hybos nankunshanensis Yang, Gaimari & Grootaert, 2005
- Hybos nanlingensis Liu, Yang & Grootaert, 2004
- Hybos nasutus Yang & Yang, 1986
- Hybos natalensis Smith, 1969
- Hybos negrobovi Liu, Grootaert & Yang, 2021
- Hybos neotropicus Bezzi, 1905
- Hybos ngachang Plant, 2013
- Hybos niger Brunetti, 1913
- Hybos nigrifemur Li, Noor, Lin & Yang, 2022
- Hybos nigripedis Hybos, 2017
- Hybos nigripes Wang & Yang, 2014
- Hybos nigronitidus Brunetti, 1913
- Hybos nitens Brunetti, 1913
- Hybos obtusatus Yang & Grootaert, 2005
- Hybos oncus Yang & Yang, 1988
- Hybos orientalis Yang & Yang, 1986
- Hybos paknok Plant, 2013
- Hybos palawanus Frey, 1953
- Hybos pallidus Yang & Yang, 1988
- Hybos pallipes Meijere, 1911
- Hybos pallipilosus Yang, An & Gao, 2002
- Hybos papuanus Kertész, 1899
- Hybos particularis Yang, Yang & Hu, 2002
- Hybos phahompokensis Plant, 2013
- Hybos pingbianensis Yang & Yang, 2004
- Hybos pisadaanus Plant, 2013
- Hybos plaumanni Ale-Rocha, 2001
- Hybos plumicornis (Bezzi, 1914)
- Hybos pollinosus Bezzi, 1904
- Hybos projectus Li, Wang & Yang, 2014
- Hybos prolatus Ale-Rocha, 2001
- Hybos psilus Yang & Yang, 1988
- Hybos qinlingensis Li, Wang & Yang, 2014
- Hybos quadriseta Yang & Merz, 2004
- Hybos reversus Walker, 1849
- Hybos robustus Ale-Rocha, 2001
- Hybos ruyuanensis Yang, Merz & Grootaert, 2006
- Hybos saenmueangmai Plant, 2013
- Hybos saigusai Chvála, 1985
- Hybos sciapterus Melander, 1928
- Hybos serratus Yang & Yang, 1993
- Hybos setosa Meijere, 1911
- Hybos shamshevi Plant, 2013
- Hybos shennongensis Yang & Yang, 1991
- Hybos shuwenae Yang & Merz, 2004
- Hybos sichuanensis Yang & Yang, 1993
- Hybos similaris Yang & Yang, 1995
- Hybos sinclairi Plant, 2013
- Hybos slossonae Coquillett, 1895
- Hybos songbai Plant, 2013
- Hybos speciosus Frey, 1953
- Hybos spinicosta Wheeler & Melander, 1901
- Hybos spinipes Frey, 1953
- Hybos starki Yang & Yang, 1995
- Hybos steatopygus Plant, 2013
- Hybos stigmaticus Plant, 2013
- Hybos subapicalis Plant, 2013
- Hybos sydneyensis Schiner, 1868
- Hybos taichungensis Yang, 2006
- Hybos taiwanensis Yang, 2006
- Hybos tenuipes Brunetti, 1913
- Hybos tenuis Meunier, 1908
- Hybos tetricus Plant, 2013
- Hybos thaosaeo Plant, 2013
- Hybos thepkaisoni Plant, 2013
- Hybos tibetanus Yang & Yang, 1988
- Hybos tibialis (Bezzi, 1912)
- Hybos tilokarati Plant, 2013
- Hybos tongmaiensis Wang & Yang, 2014
- Hybos tongshanensis Yang & Yang, 1991
- Hybos torosus Ale-Rocha, 2001
- Hybos trifurcatus Yang & Yang, 2004
- Hybos trisetosus Frey, 1953
- Hybos trispinatus Yang, Merz & Grootaert, 2006
- Hybos trunctatus Yang & Yang, 1986
- Hybos typicus Wheeler & Melander, 1901
- Hybos uniseta Yang & Yang, 2004
- Hybos vietnamensis Huo, Grootaert & Yang, 2010
- Hybos wangae Yang, Merz & Grootaert, 2006
- Hybos wangdongyanganus Cao, Yu, Wang & Yang, 2018
- Hybos wudangensis Yang & Yang, 1991
- Hybos wui Yang & Yang, 1995
- Hybos xanthomelas Saigusa, 1963
- Hybos xanthopodus Melander, 1928
- Hybos xiaohuangshanensis Yang, Gaimari & Grootaert, 2005
- Hybos xiaoyanae Jiang, Li & Yang, 2011
- Hybos xii Li, Wang & Yang, 2014
- Hybos xishuangbannaensis Yang & Yang, 2004
- Hybos yinyuhensis Yang & Li, 2011
- Hybos yungyak Plant, 2013
- Hybos yuqiangi Li, Noor, Lin & Yang, 2022
- Hybos zhangae Yang, Wang, Zhu & Zhang, 2010
- Hybos zhejiangensis Yang & Yang, 1995
- Hybos zhouae Cao, Yu, Wang & Yang, 2018
