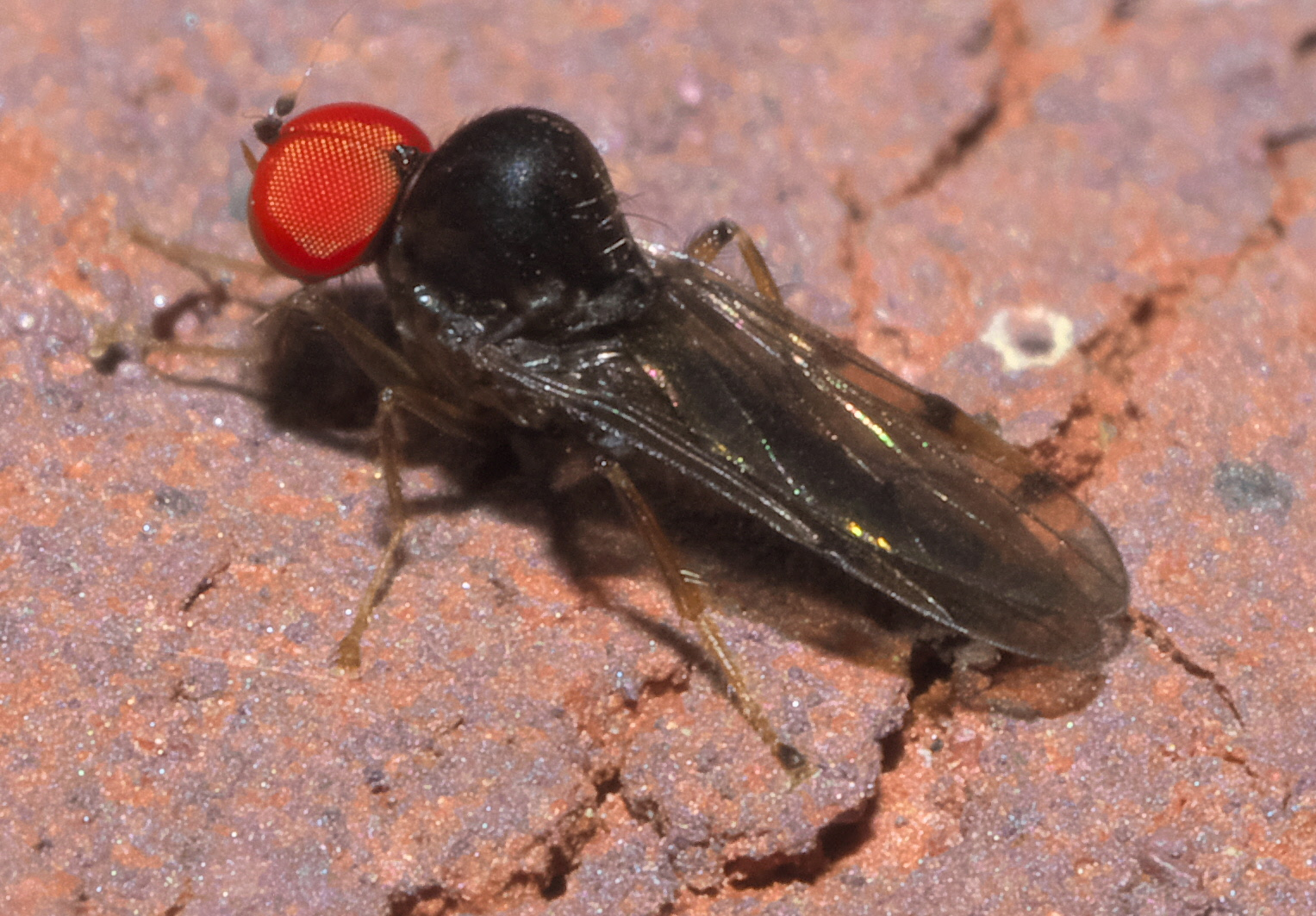
- Syneches simplex

Scientific classification
- Kingdom: Animalia
- Phylum: Arthropoda
- Class: Insecta
- Order: Diptera
- Family: Hybotidae
- Subfamily: Hybotinae
- Genus: Syneches; Walker, 1852

Type species
- Syneches simplex Walker, 1852

Synonyms
- Perospilus Bigot, 1859; Pterospilus Rondani, 1856; Pterospylus Bigot, 1889; Synechus Frey, 1917

= Syneches =

Genus of flies

Syneches is a genus of flies in the family Hybotidae.

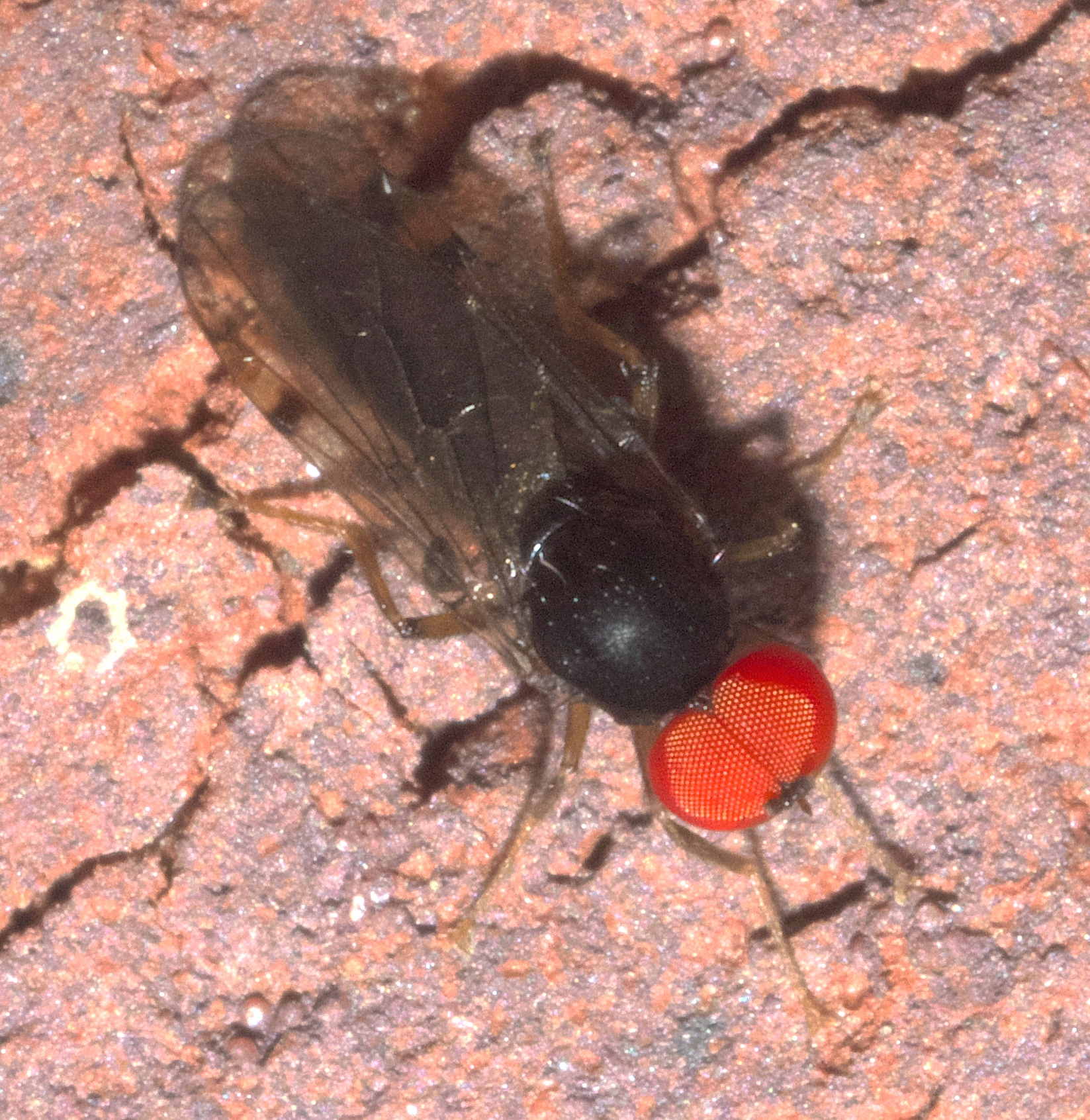
Syneches simplex

== See also ==
- List of Syneches species
