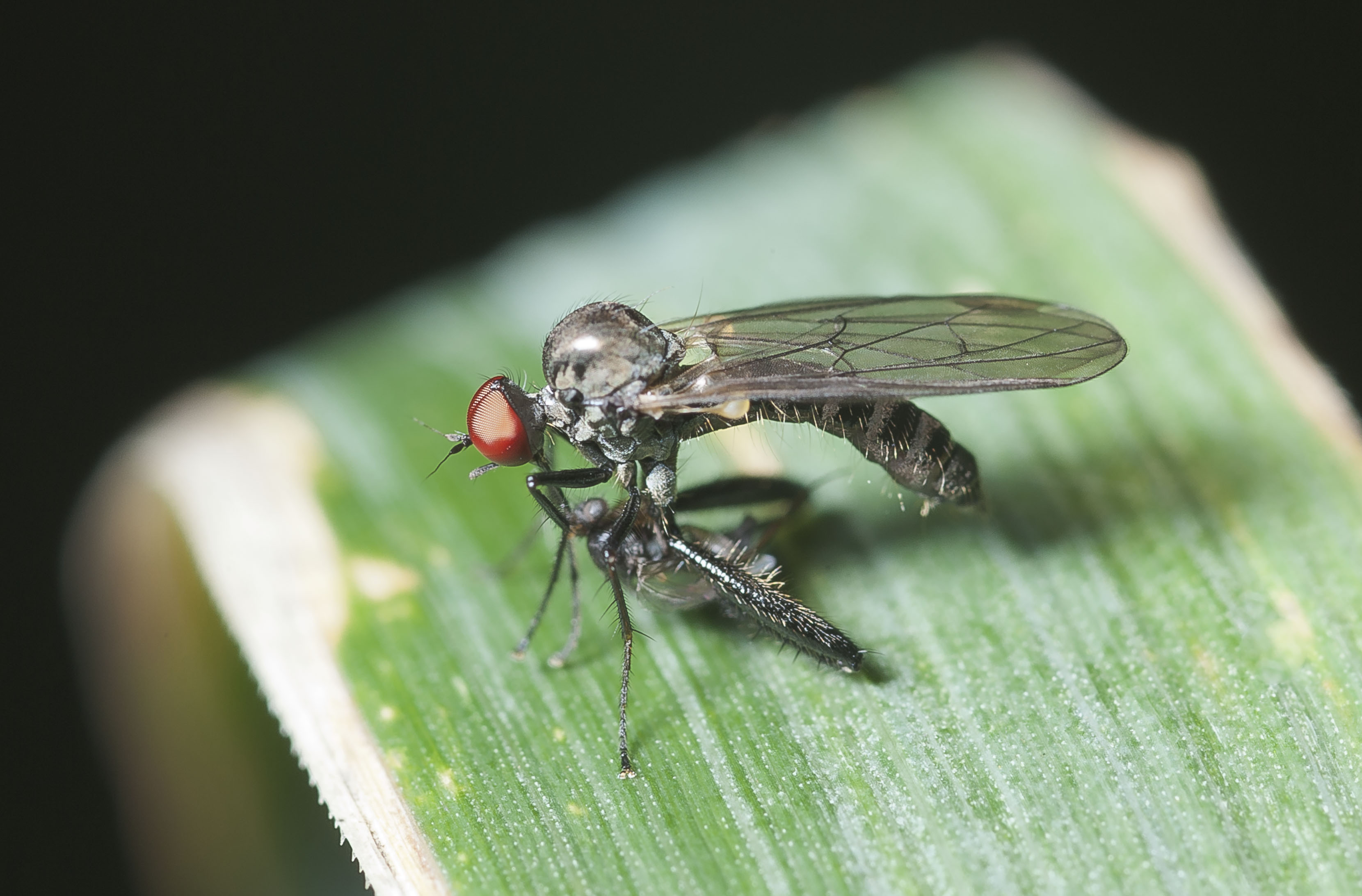
- Hybos culiciformis

Scientific classification
- Kingdom: Animalia
- Phylum: Arthropoda
- Clade: Pancrustacea
- Class: Insecta
- Order: Diptera
- Family: Hybotidae
- Subfamily: Hybotinae; Meigen, 1820

= Hybotinae =

Subfamily of flies

Hybotinae is a globally widespread subfamily of hybotid flies.

== Genera ==
- Acarterus Loew, 1858
- Afrohybos Smith, 1967
- Chillcottomyia Saigusa, 1986
- Euhybus Coquillett, 1895
- Hybos Meigen, 1803
- Lactistomyia Melander, 1902
- Lamachella Melander, 1928
- Neohybos Ale-Rocha & Carvalho, 2003
- Parahybos Kertész, 1899
- Smithybos Ale-Rocha, 2000
- Stenoproctus Loew, 1858
- Syndyas Loew, 1858
- Syneches Walker, 1852
