= List of Diptera of New Zealand =

This is a list of all species of flies (the Diptera) that are known to occur in New Zealand, based on the New Zealand Organism Register. The list contains 2,614 species as of March 2026.

== Nematocera ==
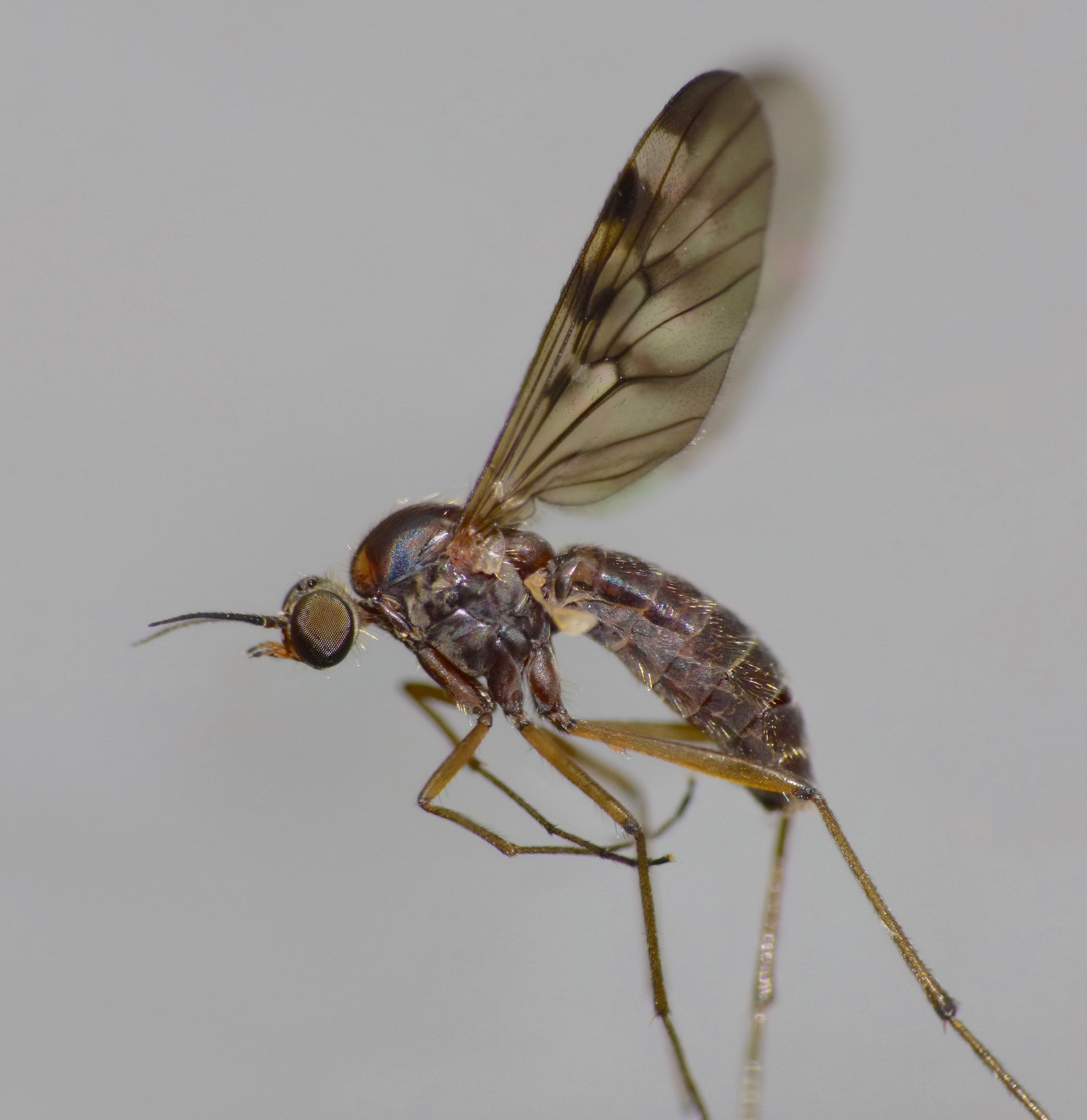
Sylvicola undulatus

=== Anisopodidae ===
- Sylvicola festivus (Edwards, 1928)
- Sylvicola neozelandicus (Schiner, 1868)
- Sylvicola notatus (Hutton, 1902)
- Sylvicola undulatus (Lamb, 1909)

=== Bibionidae ===
- Dilophus alpinus Harrison, 1990
- Dilophus crinitus (Hardy, 1951)
- Dilophus fumipennis Harrison, 1990
- Dilophus harrisoni Hardy, 1953
- Dilophus neoinsolitus Harrison, 1990
- Dilophus nigrostigma (Walker, 1848)
- Dilophus segnis Hutton, 1902
- Dilophus tuthilli (Hardy, 1953)

=== Blephariceridae ===
- Neocurupira campbelli Dumbleton, 1963
- Neocurupira chiltoni (Campbell, 1921)
- Neocurupira hudsoni Lamb, 1913
- Neocurupira rotalapiscula Craig, 1969
- Neocurupira tonnoiri Dumbleton, 1963
- Nothohoraia micrognathia Craig, 1969
- Peritheates harrisi (Campbell, 1921)
- Peritheates turrifer Lamb, 1913

=== Canthyloscelididae ===
- Canthyloscelis antennata Edwards, 1922
- Canthyloscelis balaena Hutson, 1977
- Canthyloscelis brevicornis Nagatomi, 1983
- Canthyloscelis claripennis Edwards, 1922
- Canthyloscelis nigricosta Edwards, 1922

=== Cecidomyiidae ===
- Cecidomyia dubiella Gagne, 1989
- Cecidomyia flavella Kieffer, 1913
- Cecidomyia fragilina Gagne, 1989
- Cecidomyia hirta Marshall, 1896
- Cecidomyia marshalli Gagne, 1989
- Cecidomyia melana Marshall, 1896
- Cecidomyia minuscula Gagne, 1989
- Cecidomyia scoparia Marshall, 1896
- Cecidomyia wanganuiensis Marshall, 1896
- Diadiplosis plumbea (Skuse, 1888)
- Dryomyia shawiae Anderson, 1935
- Kiefferia coprosmae Barnes & Lamb, 1954
- Miastor agricolae Marshall, 1896
- Miastor difficilis Marshall, 1896
- Mycodiplosis constricta Kolesik, 2022
- Oligotrophus coprosmae Barnes & Lamb, 1954
- Oligotrophus oleariae (Maskell, 1889)
- Porricondyla agricolae (Marshall, 1896)
- Porricondyla aurea (Marshall, 1896)
- Porricondyla magna (Marshall, 1896)
- Porricondyla ordinaria (Marshall, 1896)
- Pseudomonardia parvalobata Jaschhof, 2003
- Aphidoletes aphidimyza (Rondani, 1847)
- Contarinia jongi Kolesik, 2017
- Contarinia quinquenotata (Löw, 1888)
- Dasineura alopecuri (Reuter, 1895)
- Dasineura hebefolia (Lamb, 1951)
- Dasineura mali (Kieffer, 1904)
- Dasineura pyri (Bouche, 1847)
- Eucalyptodiplosis chionochloae Kolesik, 2007
- Feltiella acarisuga (Vallot, 1827)
- Mayetiola destructor (Say, 1817)
- Proterodiplosis radicis Wyatt, 1963
- Rhopalomyia chrysanthemi Ahlberg, 1939
- Stenodiplosis geniculati (Reuter, 1895)
- Stephodiplosis nothofagi Barnes, 1936
- Zeuxidiplosis giardi (Kieffer, 1896)
- Lestremia cinerea Macquart, 1826
- Lestremia leucophaea (Meigen, 1818)
- Lestremia novaezealandiae Marshall, 1896
- Amediella involuta Jaschhof, 2003
- Aprionus bullerensis Jaschhof, 2004
- Aprionus mycophiloides Jaschhof, 2004
- Aprionus remotus Jaschhof, 2004
- Campylomyza flavipes Meigen, 1818
- Monardia dividua Jaschhof, 2004
- Monardia fumea Jaschhof, 2004
- Monardia furcillata Jaschhof, 2004
- Monardia modica Jaschhof, 2004
- Monardia stirpium Kieffer, 1895
- Mycophila fungicola Felt, 1911
- Peromyia carinata Jaschhof, 2001
- Peromyia clandestina Jaschhof, 2004
- Peromyia culta Jaschhof, 2004
- Peromyia derupta Jaschhof, 2004
- Peromyia didhami Jaschhof, 2004
- Peromyia dissona Jaschhof, 2004
- Peromyia doci Jaschhof, 2004
- Peromyia insueta Jaschhof, 2004
- Peromyia intecta Jaschhof, 2004
- Peromyia intonsa Jaschhof, 2004
- Peromyia katieae Jaschhof, 2004
- Peromyia latebrosa Jaschhof, 2004
- Peromyia memoranda Jaschhof, 2004
- Peromyia mountalbertiensis Jaschhof, 2004
- Peromyia multifurcata Jaschhof, 2004
- Peromyia muscorum (Kieffer, 1895)
- Peromyia novaezealandiae Jaschhof, 2004
- Peromyia obunca Jaschhof, 2004
- Peromyia palustris (Kieffer, 1895)
- Peromyia perardua Jaschhof, 2004
- Peromyia pertrita Jaschhof, 2004
- Peromyia plena Jaschhof, 2004
- Peromyia praeclara Jaschhof, 2004
- Peromyia rara Jaschhof, 2004
- Peromyia rotoitiensis Jaschhof, 2004
- Peromyia sera Jaschhof, 2004
- Peromyia serrata Jaschhof, 2004
- Peromyia setosa Jaschhof, 2004
- Peromyia sinuosa Jaschhof, 2004
- Peromyia spinigera Jaschhof, 2004
- Peromyia squamigera Jaschhof, 2004
- Peromyia tecta Jaschhof, 2004
- Peromyia tumida Jaschhof, 2004
- Polyardis illustris Jaschhof, 2004
- Polyardis triangula Jaschhof, 2004
- Pseudomonardia australis Jaschhof, 2003
- Pseudomonardia communis Jaschhof, 2003
- Pseudomonardia elongata Jaschhof, 2003
- Pseudomonardia glacialis Jaschhof, 2003
- Pseudomonardia hutchesoni Jaschhof, 2003
- Pseudomonardia invisitata Jaschhof, 2003
- Pseudomonardia neurolygoides Jaschhof, 2003
- Pseudomonardia pallida Jaschhof, 2003
- Pseudomonardia parva Jaschhof, 2003
- Pseudomonardia parvolobata Jaschhof, 2003
- Pseudomonardia vicina Jaschhof, 2003
- Pteridomyia bilobata Jaschhof, 2003
- Pteridomyia gressitti (Yukawa, 1964)
- Asynapta bicornis Jaschhof and Jaschhof, 2022
- Camptomyia rakiura Jaschhof and Jaschhof, 2022
- Colomyia inexpectata Jaschhof and Jaschhof, 2022
- Divellepidosis constricta Jaschhof and Jaschhof, 2022
- Divellepidosis eximia Jaschhof and Jaschhof, 2022
- Divellepidosis tewaipounamu Jaschhof and Jaschhof, 2022
- Glemparon aotearoa Jaschhof and Jaschhof, 2018
- Glemparon birhojohmi Jaschhof and Jaschhof, 2018
- Glemparon cervus Jaschhof and Jaschhof, 2018
- Glemparon didhami Jaschhof and Jaschhof, 2018
- Glemparon kaikoura Jaschhof and Jaschhof, 2018
- Glemparon nativitas Jaschhof and Jaschhof, 2018
- Glemparon orautahi Jaschhof and Jaschhof, 2018
- Glemparon pureora Jaschhof and Jaschhof, 2018
- Glemparon rakiura Jaschhof and Jaschhof, 2018
- Glemparon rotoiti Jaschhof and Jaschhof, 2018
- Glemparon rotoroa Jaschhof and Jaschhof, 2018
- Glemparon tewaipounamu Jaschhof and Jaschhof, 2018
- Glemparon waipapa Jaschhof and Jaschhof, 2018
- Glemparon waipoua Jaschhof and Jaschhof, 2018
- Paratetraneuromyia denticulata Jaschhof and Jaschhof, 2022
- Paratetraneuromyia multidenticulata Jaschhof and Jaschhof, 2022
- Yukawaepidosis aliculata Yukawa, 1964
- Yukawaepidosis kaikoura Jaschhof and Jaschhof, 2022

=== Ceratopogonidae ===
- Atrichopogon fitzroyi Macfie, 1932
- Atrichopogon greyi Macfie, 1932
- Atrichopogon hobsoni Macfie, 1932
- Atrichopogon shortlandi Macfie, 1932
- Atrichopogon vestitipennis Kieffer, 1917
- Austrohelea antipodalis (Ingram & Macfie, 1931)
- Austrohelea campbellensis (Tokunaga, 1964)
- Austrohelea ferruginea (Macfie, 1932)
- Austrohelea tonnoiri (Macfie, 1932)
- Dasyhelea aucklandensis Sublette & Wirth, 1980
- Dasyhelea jucunda Macfie, 1932
- Dasyhelea oribates Macfie, 1932
- Forcipomyia antipodum (Hudson, 1892)
- Forcipomyia austrina Macfie, 1932
- Forcipomyia belkini de Meillon & Wirth, 1979
- Forcipomyia cooki Macfie, 1932
- Forcipomyia desurvillei Macfie, 1932
- Forcipomyia kuscheli Sublette & Wirth, 1980
- Forcipomyia parvicellula Ingram & Macfie, 1931
- Forcipomyia tapleyi Ingram & Macfie, 1931
- Forcipomyia tasmani Macfie, 1932
- Leptoconops myersi (Tonnoir, 1924)
- Monohelea clavipes Macfie, 1932
- Monohelea nubeculosa Macfie, 1932
- Palpomyia cantuaris Ingram & Macfie, 1931
- Palpomyia nelsoni Macfie, 1932
- Palpomyia rastellifera Macfie, 1932
- Palpomyia urpicifemoris Macfie, 1932
- Paradasyhelea egregia (Macfie, 1932)
- Paradasyhelea harrisoni Wirth, 1981
- Stilobezzia antipodalis Ingram & Macfie, 1931
- Stilobezzia badia Macfie, 1932
- Stilobezzia ohakunei Ingram & Macfie, 1931
- Stilobezzia tonnoiri Macfie, 1932

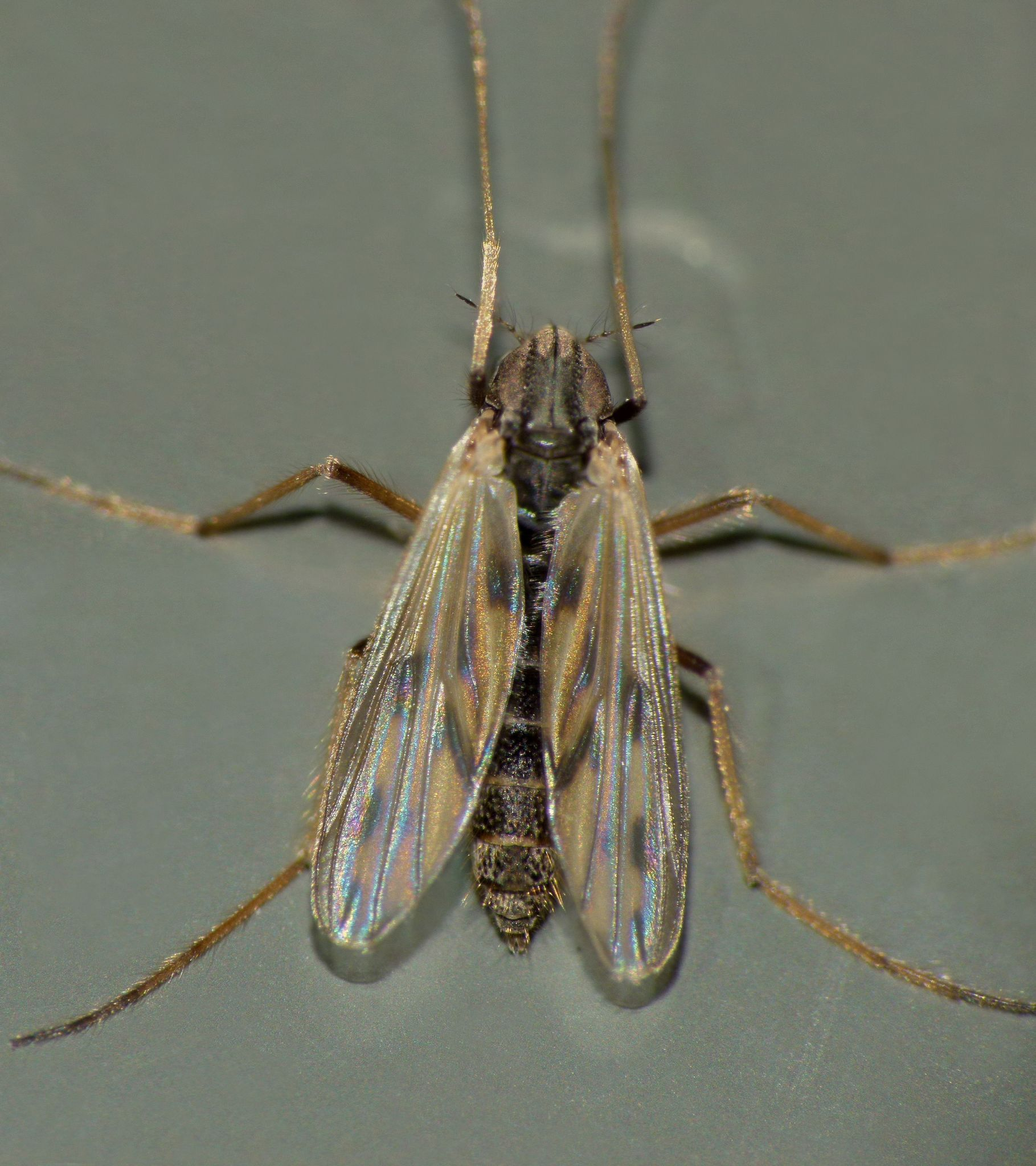
Polypedilum pavidum

=== Chironomidae ===
- Ablabesmyia mala (Hutton, 1902)
- Anatopynia boninensis Tokunaga, 1964
- Anatopynia elongata Tokunaga, 1964
- Anatopynia pennipes Freeman, 1961
- Anzacladius kiwi Cranston, 2009
- Apsectrotanypus cana (Freeman, 1959)
- Apsectrotanypus quadricincta (Freeman, 1959)
- Austrocladius harrisi (Freeman, 1959)
- Camptocladius stercorarius (De Geer, 1776)
- Chironomus analis Freeman, 1959
- Chironomus antipodensis Sublette & Wirth, 1980
- Chironomus forsythi Martin, 1999
- Chironomus subantarcticus Sublette & Wirth, 1980
- Chironomus zealandicus Hudson, 1892
- Cladopelma curtivalva (Kieffer, 1917)
- Corynoneura scutellata Winnertz, 1846
- Cricotopus aucklandicus Sublette & Wirth, 1980
- Cricotopus cingulatus (Hutton, 1902)
- Cricotopus hollyfordensis Boothroyd, 2002
- Cricotopus planus Boothroyd, 1990
- Cricotopus vincenti Boothroyd, 1990
- Cricotopus zealandicus Freeman, 1959
- Eukiefferiella brundini Boothroyd & Cranston, 1995
- Eukiefferiella commensalis (Tonnoir, 1923)
- Eukiefferiella heveli Sublette & Wirth, 1980
- Gressittius antarcticus (Hudson, 1892)
- Gressittius umbrosus (Freeman, 1959)
- Gymnometriocnemus lobifer (Freeman, 1959)
- Gynnidocladius pilulus Sublette & Wirth, 1980
- Harrisius pallidus Freeman, 1959
- Hevelius carinatus Sublette & Wirth, 1980
- Kaniwhaniwhanus chapmanae Boothroyd, 1999
- Kaniwhaniwhanus chapmani Boothroyd, 1999
- Kiefferulus opalensis Forsyth, 1975
- Kuschelius dentifer Sublette & Wirth, 1980
- Limnophyes vestitus (Skuse, 1889)
- Lobodiamesa campbelli Pagast, 1947
- Macropelopia apicincta (Freeman, 1959)
- Macropelopia apicinella (Freeman, 1959)
- Macropelopia flavipes (Freeman, 1959)
- Macropelopia quinquepunctata (Freeman, 1959)
- Maoridiamesa glacialis Brundin, 1966
- Maoridiamesa harrisi Pagast, 1947
- Maoridiamesa insularis Brundin, 1966
- Maoridiamesa intermedia Brundin, 1966
- Maoridiamesa stouti Brundin, 1966
- Maryella reducta Sublette & Wirth, 1980
- Mecaorus elongatus Sublette & Wirth, 1980
- Nakataia cisdentifer Sublette & Wirth, 1980
- Naonella forsythi Boothroyd, 1994
- Naonella kimihia Boothroyd, 2005
- Nesiocladius gressitti Sublette & Wirth, 1980
- Ophryophorus ramiferus Freeman, 1959
- Orthocladius pictipennis Freeman, 1959
- Orthocladius publicus Hutton, 1902
- Parachironomus cylindricus (Freeman, 1959)
- Paratanytarsus grimmii (Schneider, 1885)
- Paratrichocladius pluriserialis (Freeman, 1959)
- Parochlus aotearoae Brundin, 1966
- Parochlus brevis Sublette & Wirth, 1980
- Parochlus carinatus Brundin, 1966
- Parochlus conjugens Brundin, 1966
- Parochlus glacialis Brundin, 1966
- Parochlus gressitti Sublette & Wirth, 1980
- Parochlus longicornis Brundin, 1966
- Parochlus maorii Brundin, 1966
- Parochlus novaezelandiae Brundin, 1966
- Parochlus ohakunensis (Freeman, 1959)
- Parochlus pauperatus Brundin, 1966
- Parochlus reductus Sublette & Wirth, 1980
- Parochlus rennelli Sublette & Wirth, 1980
- Parochlus spinosus Brundin, 1966
- Paucispinigera approximata Freeman, 1959
- Pirara matakiri Boothroyd & Cranston, 1995
- Podochlus cockaynei Brundin, 1966
- Podochlus grandis Brundin, 1966
- Podochlus knoxi Brundin, 1966
- Podochlus stouti Brundin, 1966
- Podonomus parochloides Brundin, 1966
- Podonomus pygmaeus Brundin, 1966
- Podonomus waikukupae Brundin, 1966
- Polypedilum alternans Forsyth, 1971
- Polypedilum canum Freeman, 1959
- Polypedilum cumberi Freeman, 1959
- Polypedilum digitulum Freeman, 1959
- Polypedilum harrisi Freeman, 1959
- Polypedilum lentum (Hutton, 1902)
- Polypedilum longicrus Kieffer, 1921
- Polypedilum luteum Forsyth, 1971
- Polypedilum opimum (Hutton, 1902)
- Polypedilum pavidum (Hutton, 1902)
- Pterosis wisei Sublette & Wirth, 1980
- Riethia zeylandica Freeman, 1959
- Semiocladius kuscheli Sublette & Wirth, 1980
- Semiocladius reinga (Leader, 1975)
- Semiocladius whangaroa (Leader, 1975)
- Smittia verna (Hutton, 1902)
- Stictocladius lacuniferus (Freeman, 1959)
- Stictocladius pictus (Freeman, 1959)
- Tanypus debilis Hutton, 1902
- Tanypus languidus Hutton, 1902
- Tanytarsus albanyensis Forsyth, 1971
- Tanytarsus funebris Freeman, 1959
- Tanytarsus vespertinus Hutton, 1902
- Telmatogeton antipodensis Sublette & Wirth, 1980
- Telmatogeton mortoni Leader, 1975
- Tonnoirocladius commensalis (Tonnoir, 1923)
- Xenochironomus canterburyensis Freeman, 1959
- Zavrelimyia harrisi (Freeman, 1959)
- Zelandochlus latipalpis Brundin, 1966

=== Corethrellidae ===
- Corethrella novaezealandiae Tonnoir, 1927

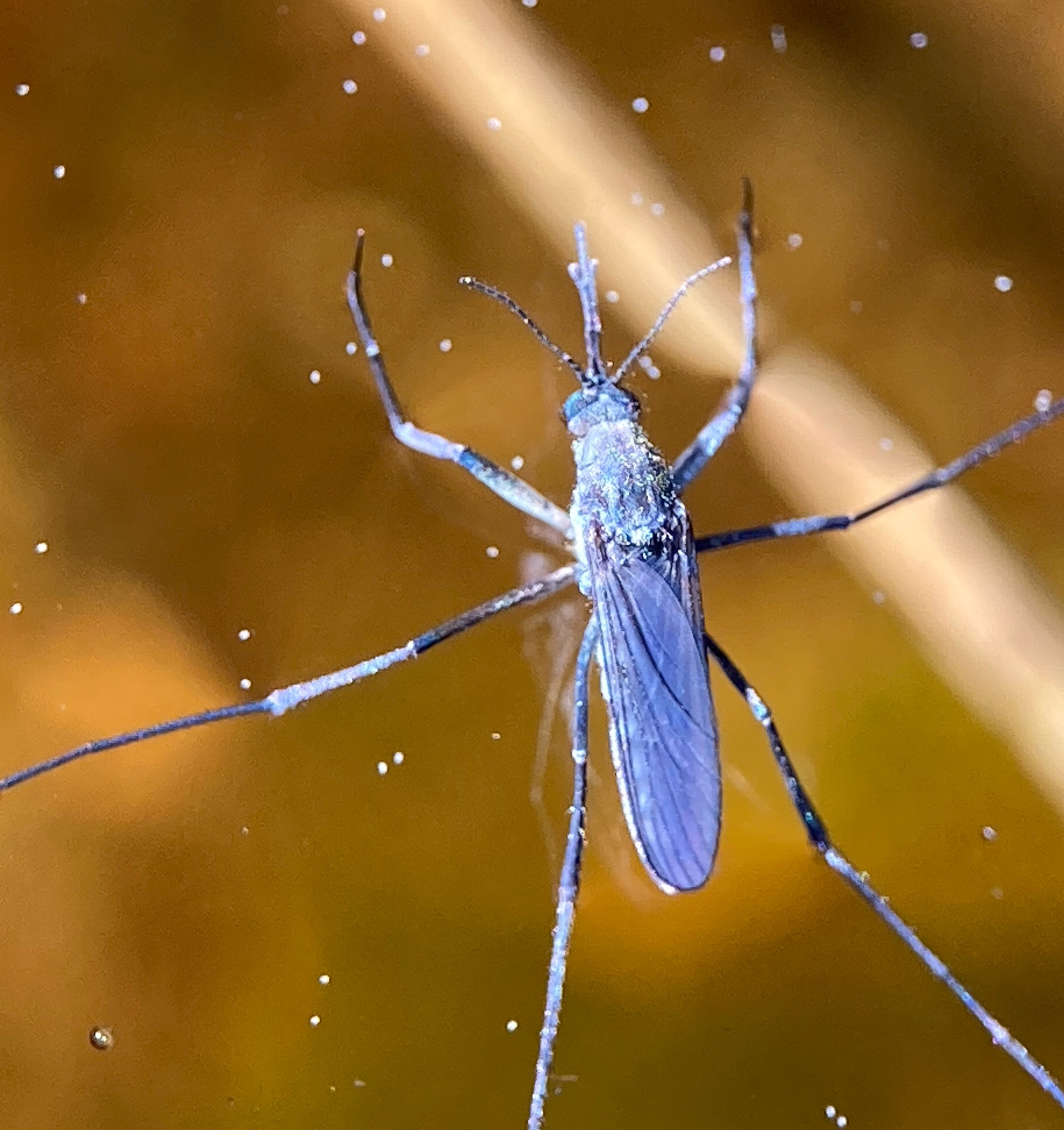
Opifex fuscus

=== Culicidae ===
- Aedes antipodeus (Edwards, 1920)
- Aedes arundinariae Kasper, 2020
- Aedes australis (Erichson, 1842)
- Aedes chathamicus Dumbleton, 1962
- Aedes notoscriptus (Skuse, 1889)
- Aedes subalbirostris Klein & Marks, 1960
- Coquillettidia iracunda (Walker, 1848)
- Coquillettidia tenuipalpis (Edwards, 1924)
- Culex asteliae Belkin, 1968
- Culex pervigilans Bergroth, 1889
- Culex quinquefasciatus Say, 1823
- Culex rotoruae Belkin, 1968
- Culiseta novaezealandiae Pillai, 1966
- Culiseta tonnoiri (Edwards, 1925)
- Maorigoeldia argyropa (Walker, 1848)
- Opifex fuscus Hutton, 1902

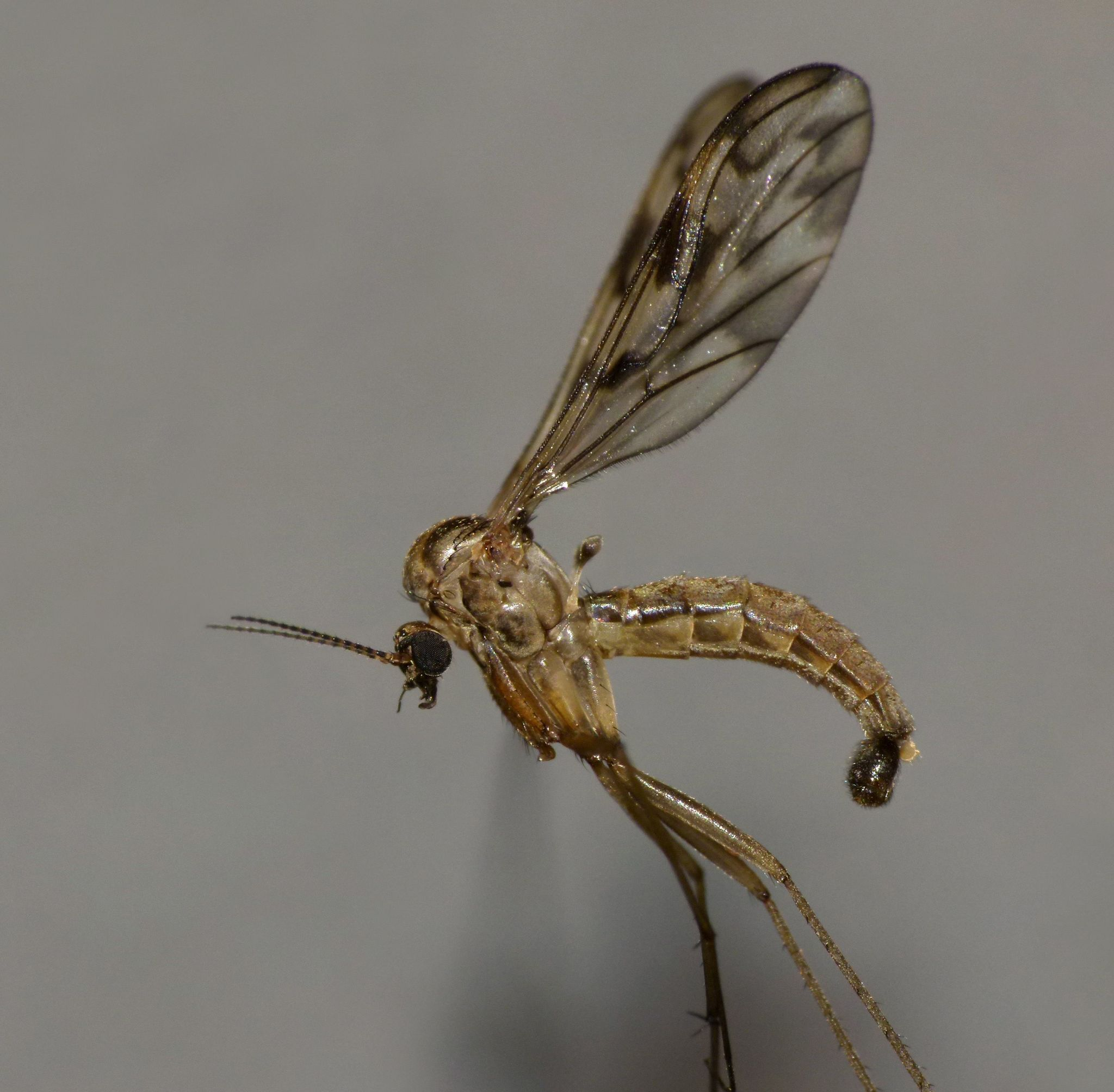
Nervijuncta wakefieldi

=== Ditomyiidae ===
- Australosymmerus basalis (Tonnoir, 1927)
- Australosymmerus fumipennis (Tonnoir, 1927)
- Australosymmerus nitidus (Tonnoir, 1927)
- Australosymmerus tillyardi (Tonnoir, 1927)
- Australosymmerus trivittatus Edwards, 1927
- Nervijuncta bicolor Edwards, 1927
- Nervijuncta flavoscutellata Tonnoir, 1927
- Nervijuncta harrisi Edwards, 1927
- Nervijuncta hexachaeta Edwards, 1927
- Nervijuncta hudsoni (Marshall, 1896)
- Nervijuncta longicauda Edwards, 1927
- Nervijuncta marshalli Edwards, 1927
- Nervijuncta nigrescens Marshall, 1896
- Nervijuncta nigricornis Tonnoir, 1927
- Nervijuncta nigricoxa Edwards, 1927
- Nervijuncta ostensackeni Tonnoir, 1927
- Nervijuncta parvicauda Edwards, 1927
- Nervijuncta pilicornis Edwards, 1927
- Nervijuncta pulchella Edwards, 1927
- Nervijuncta punctata Tonnoir, 1927
- Nervijuncta ruficeps Edwards, 1927
- Nervijuncta tridens (Hutton, 1881)
- Nervijuncta wakefieldi (Edwards, 1921)

=== Dixidae ===
- Dixella fuscinervis (Tonnoir, 1924)
- Dixella harrisi (Tonnoir, 1925)
- Dixella neozelandica (Tonnoir, 1924)
- Dixella tonnoiri (Belkin, 1968)
- Neodixa minuta (Tonnoir, 1924)
- Nothodixa campbelli (Alexander, 1922)
- Nothodixa otagensis (Alexander, 1922)
- Nothodixa philpotti (Tonnoir, 1924)
- Nothodixa septentrionalis (Tonnoir, 1924)

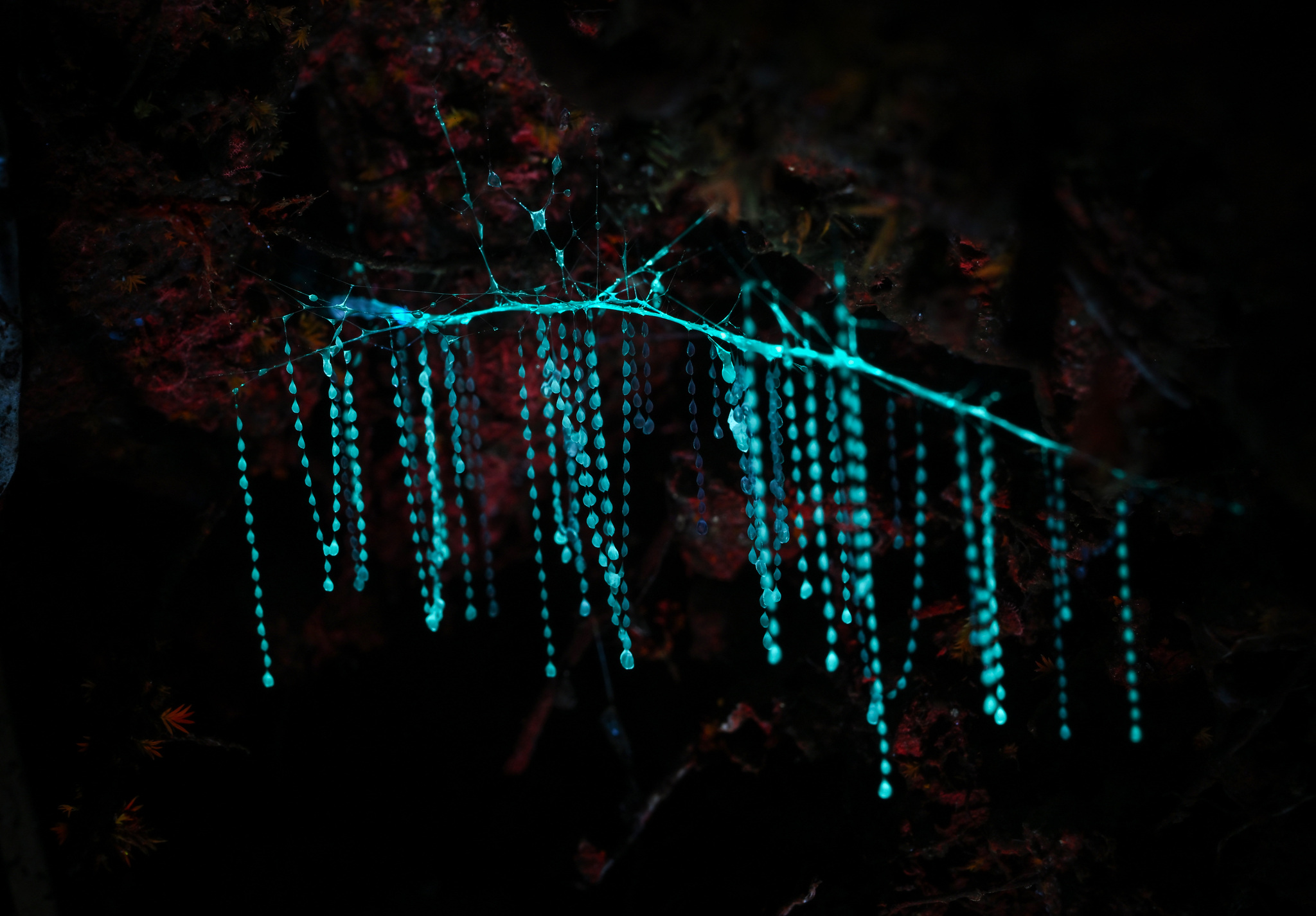
Arachnocampa luminosa

=== Keroplatidae ===
- Arachnocampa luminosa (Skuse, 1891)
- Cerotelion bimaculatum Tonnoir, 1927
- Cerotelion dendyi (Marshall, 1896)
- Cerotelion hudsoni (Marshall, 1896)
- Cerotelion leucoceras (Marshall, 1896)
- Cerotelion nigrum Tonnoir, 1927
- Cerotelion tapleyi Edwards, 1927
- Cerotelion vitripenne Tonnoir, 1927
- Chiasmoneura fenestrata (Edwards, 1927)
- Chiasmoneura milligani (Tonnoir, 1927)
- Isoneuromyia harrisi (Tonnoir, 1927)
- Isoneuromyia novaezelandiae (Tonnoir, 1927)
- Macrocera annulata Tonnoir, 1927
- Macrocera antennatis Marshall, 1896
- Macrocera campbelli Edwards, 1927
- Macrocera fusca Tonnoir, 1927
- Macrocera glabrata Tonnoir, 1927
- Macrocera gourlayi Tonnoir, 1927
- Macrocera howletti Marshall, 1896
- Macrocera hudsoni Tonnoir, 1927
- Macrocera ngaireae Edwards, 1927
- Macrocera obsoleta Edwards, 1927
- Macrocera pulchra Tonnoir, 1927
- Macrocera ruficollis Edwards, 1927
- Macrocera scoparia Marshall, 1896
- Macrocera tonnoiri Matile, 1989
- Macrocera unipunctata Tonnoir, 1927
- Neoplatyura brookesi (Edwards, 1927)
- Neoplatyura lamellata (Tonnoir, 1927)
- Neoplatyura marshalli (Tonnoir, 1927)
- Neoplatyura proxima (Tonnoir, 1927)
- Orfelia nemoralis (Meigen, 1818)
- Paramacrocera brevicornis Edwards, 1927
- Platyura albovittata Tonnoir, 1927
- Pseudoplatyura truncata Tonnoir, 1927
- Pyrtaula agricolae (Marshall, 1896)
- Pyrtaula campbelli (Tonnoir, 1927)
- Pyrtaula carbonaria (Tonnoir, 1927)
- Pyrtaula chiltoni (Tonnoir, 1927)
- Pyrtaula curtisi (Edwards, 1927)
- Pyrtaula maculipennis (Tonnoir, 1927)
- Pyrtaula ohakunensis (Edwards, 1927)
- Pyrtaula philpotti (Tonnoir, 1927)
- Pyrtaula punctifusa (Edwards, 1927)
- Pyrtaula ruficauda (Tonnoir, 1927)
- Pyrtaula rufipectus (Tonnoir, 1927)
- Pyrtaula rutila (Edwards, 1927)
- Rypatula brevis (Tonnoir, 1927)
- Rypatula subbrevis (Tonnoir, 1927)

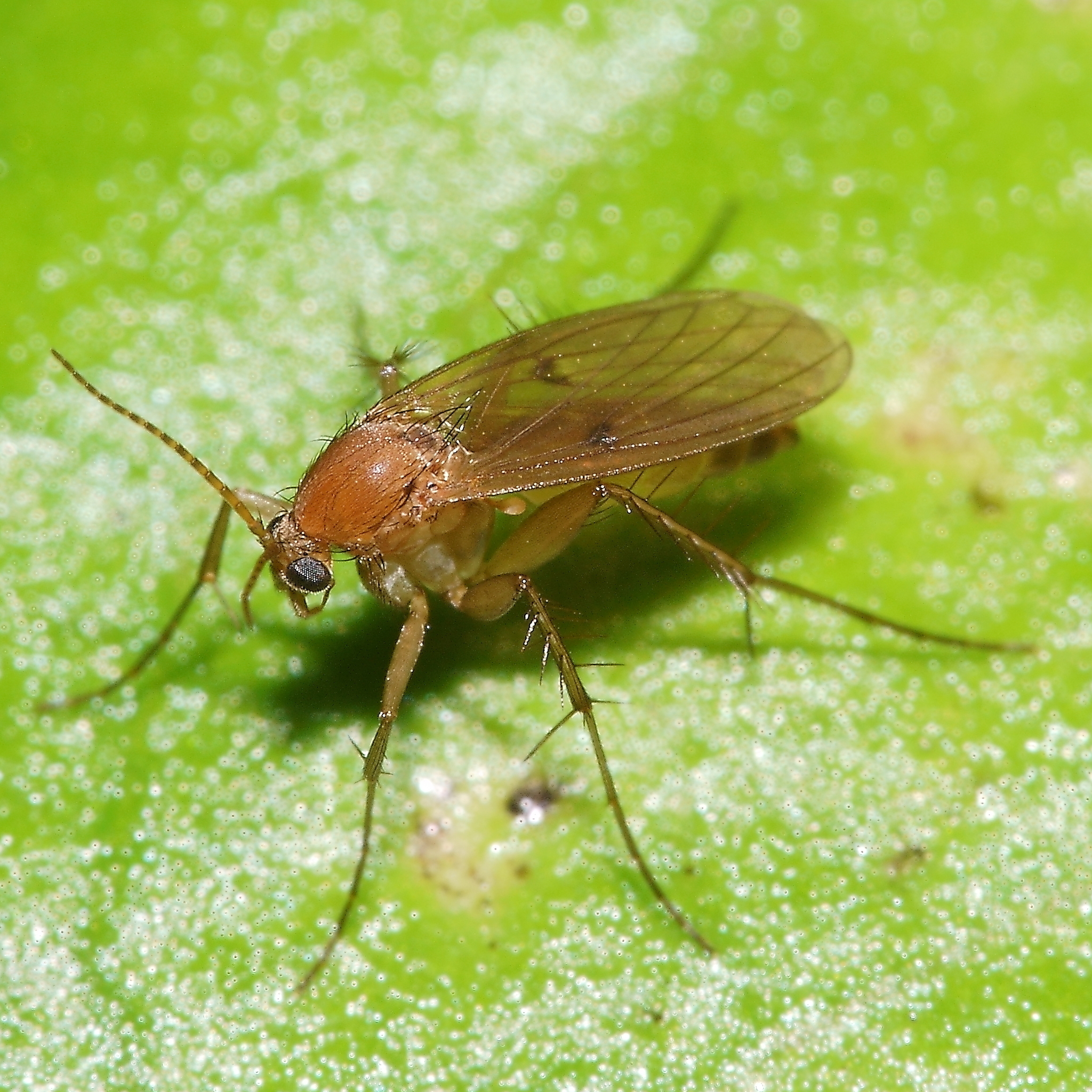
Mycetophila fagi

=== Mycetophilidae ===
- Allocotocera anaclinoides (Marshall, 1896)
- Allocotocera cephasi Edwards, 1927
- Allocotocera crassipalpis Tonnoir, 1927
- Allocotocera dilatata Tonnoir, 1927
- Aneura appendiculata Tonnoir, 1927
- Aneura bispinosa Edwards, 1927
- Aneura boletinoides Marshall, 1896
- Aneura defecta Edwards, 1927
- Aneura fagi (Marshall, 1896)
- Aneura filiformis Tonnoir, 1927
- Aneura fusca Tonnoir, 1927
- Aneura jaschhofi Zaitzev, 2001
- Aneura longicauda Tonnoir, 1927
- Aneura longipalpis Tonnoir, 1927
- Aneura nitida Tonnoir, 1927
- Aneura pallida Edwards, 1927
- Aneura tonnoiri Zaitzev, 2001
- Anomalomyia affinis Tonnoir, 1927
- Anomalomyia basalis Tonnoir, 1927
- Anomalomyia flavicauda Edwards, 1927
- Anomalomyia guttata (Hutton, 1881)
- Anomalomyia guttata (Hutton, 1901)
- Anomalomyia immaculata Edwards, 1927
- Anomalomyia minor (Marshall, 1896)
- Anomalomyia obscura Tonnoir, 1927
- Anomalomyia subobscura Tonnoir, 1927
- Anomalomyia thompsoni Tonnoir, 1927
- Anomalomyia viatoris Edwards, 1927
- Austrosynapha apicalis (Tonnoir, 1927)
- Austrosynapha cawthroni (Tonnoir, 1927)
- Austrosynapha claripennis (Tonnoir, 1927)
- Austrosynapha gracilis (Tonnoir, 1927)
- Austrosynapha parva (Edwards, 1927)
- Austrosynapha pulchella (Tonnoir, 1927)
- Austrosynapha similis (Tonnoir, 1927)
- Brevicornu antennata (Harrison, 1964)
- Brevicornu brunnea (Harrison, 1964)
- Brevicornu flavum Marshall, 1896
- Brevicornu fragile Marshall, 1896
- Brevicornu maculatum (Tonnoir, 1927)
- Brevicornu marshalli Zaitzev, 2002
- Brevicornu matilei Zaitzev, 2002
- Brevicornu quadriseta (Edwards, 1927)
- Brevicornu rufithorax (Tonnoir, 1927)
- Brevicornu subrufithorax Zaitzev, 2002
- Brevicornu tongariro Zaitzev, 2002
- Cawthronia nigra Tonnoir, 1927
- Cowanomyia hillaryi Jaschhof & Jaschhof, 2009
- Cycloneura flava Marshall, 1896
- Cycloneura triangulata Tonnoir, 1927
- Exechia biseta Edwards, 1927
- Exechia filata Edwards, 1927
- Exechia hiemalis (Marshall, 1896)
- Exechia howesi Edwards, 1927
- Exechia novaezelandiae Tonnoir, 1927
- Exechia thomsoni Miller, 1918
- Leia arsona Hutson, 1978
- Manota birgitae Jaschhof & Jaschhof, 2010
- Manota granvillensis Jaschhof & Jaschhof, 2010
- Manota maorica Edwards, 1927
- Manota purakaunui Jaschhof & Jaschhof, 2010
- Manota regineae Jaschhof & Jaschhof, 2010
- Morganiella fusca Tonnoir, 1927
- Mycetophila campbellensis Harrison, 1964
- Mycetophila clara Tonnoir, 1927
- Mycetophila colorata Tonnoir, 1927
- Mycetophila conica Tonnoir, 1927
- Mycetophila consobrina Tonnoir, 1927
- Mycetophila crassitarsis Edwards, 1927
- Mycetophila curtisi Edwards, 1927
- Mycetophila diffusa Tonnoir, 1927
- Mycetophila dilatata Tonnoir, 1927
- Mycetophila elegans Tonnoir, 1927
- Mycetophila elongata Tonnoir, 1927
- Mycetophila fagi Marshall, 1896
- Mycetophila filicornis Tonnoir, 1927
- Mycetophila fumosa Tonnoir, 1927
- Mycetophila furtiva Tonnoir, 1927
- Mycetophila grandis Tonnoir, 1927
- Mycetophila grisescens Edwards, 1927
- Mycetophila harrisi Edwards, 1927
- Mycetophila howletti Marshall, 1896
- Mycetophila impunctata Edwards, 1927
- Mycetophila integra Tonnoir, 1927
- Mycetophila intermedia Edwards, 1927
- Mycetophila latifascia Edwards, 1927
- Mycetophila lomondensis Edwards, 1927
- Mycetophila luteolateralis Edwards, 1927
- Mycetophila marshalli Enderlein, 1910
- Mycetophila media Tonnoir, 1927
- Mycetophila minima Edwards, 1927
- Mycetophila nigricans Tonnoir, 1927
- Mycetophila nigripalpis Edwards, 1927
- Mycetophila nitens Tonnoir, 1927
- Mycetophila nitidula Edwards, 1927
- Mycetophila ornatissima Tonnoir, 1927
- Mycetophila phyllura Edwards, 1927
- Mycetophila pollicata Edwards, 1927
- Mycetophila pseudomarshalli Tonnoir, 1927
- Mycetophila solitaria Tonnoir, 1927
- Mycetophila spinigera Tonnoir, 1927
- Mycetophila submarshalli Tonnoir, 1927
- Mycetophila subnitens Edwards, 1927
- Mycetophila subspinigera Tonnoir, 1927
- Mycetophila subtenebrosa Tonnoir, 1927
- Mycetophila subtillis Tonnoir, 1927
- Mycetophila subtillis Tonnoir,,
- Mycetophila sylvatica Marshall, 1896
- Mycetophila tapleyi Edwards, 1927
- Mycetophila tenebrosa Edwards, 1927
- Mycetophila tonnoiri Matile, 1989
- Mycetophila trispinosa Tonnoir, 1927
- Mycetophila unispinosa Tonnoir, 1927
- Mycetophila virgata Tonnoir, 1927
- Mycetophila viridis Edwards, 1927
- Mycetophila vulgaris Tonnoir, 1927
- Mycomya flavilatera Tonnoir, 1927
- Mycomya furcata Edwards, 1927
- Mycomya plagiata Tonnoir, 1927
- Mycomya quadrimaculata Kerr, Thompson, and Kerr, 2023
- Neoaphelomera elongata (Tonnoir, 1927)
- Neoaphelomera forcipata (Edwards, 1927)
- Neoaphelomera longicauda (Edwards, 1927)
- Neoaphelomera majuscula (Edwards, 1927)
- Neoaphelomera marshalli (Edwards, 1927)
- Neoaphelomera opaca (Tonnoir, 1927)
- Neoaphelomera skusei (Marshall, 1896)
- Neotrizygia obscura Tonnoir, 1927
- Paracycloneura apicalis Tonnoir, 1927
- Paracycloneura inopinata Jaschhof & Kallweit, 2009
- Paradoxa fusca Marshall, 1896
- Parvicellula apicalis Tonnoir, 1927
- Parvicellula fuscipennis Edwards, 1927
- Parvicellula gracilis Tonnoir, 1927
- Parvicellula hamata Edwards, 1927
- Parvicellula nigricoxa Tonnoir, 1927
- Parvicellula obscura Tonnoir, 1927
- Parvicellula ruficoxa Tonnoir, 1927
- Parvicellula subhamata Tonnoir, 1927
- Parvicellula triangula Marshall, 1896
- Phthinia longiventris Tonnoir, 1927
- Platurocypta dilatata Tonnoir, 1927
- Platurocypta immaculata (Tonnoir, 1927)
- Sciophila ocreata Phillipi, 1865
- Sciophila parviareolata Santos Abreu, 1920
- Sigmoleia melanoxantha Edwards, 1927
- Sigmoleia peterjohnsi Jaschhof & Kallweit, 2009
- Sigmoleia separata Jaschhof & Kallweit, 2009
- Sigmoleia similis Jaschhof & Kallweit, 2009
- Taxicnemis flava Edwards, 1927
- Taxicnemis marshalli Matile, 1989
- Tetragoneura exigua Matile, 1989
- Tetragoneura flexa Edwards, 1927
- Tetragoneura fusca Tonnoir, 1927
- Tetragoneura minima Tonnoir, 1927
- Tetragoneura nigra Marshall, 1896
- Tetragoneura obliqua Edwards, 1927
- Tetragoneura obscura Tonnoir, 1927
- Tetragoneura opaca Tonnoir, 1927
- Tetragoneura proxima Tonnoir, 1927
- Tetragoneura rufipes Tonnoir, 1927
- Tetragoneura spinipes Edwards, 1927
- Tetragoneura tonnoiri Matile, 1989
- Tetragoneura ultima Tonnoir, 1927
- Tetragoneura venusta Tonnoir, 1927
- Tonnwardsia aberrans (Tonnoir, 1927)
- Trichoterga monticola Tonnoir, 1927
- Waipapamyia dentata Jaschhof & Kallweit, 2009
- Waipapamyia elongata Jaschhof & Kallweit, 2009
- Waipapamyia truncata Jaschhof & Kallweit, 2009
- Zygomyia acuta Tonnoir, 1927
- Zygomyia albinotata Tonnoir, 1927
- Zygomyia apicalis Tonnoir, 1927
- Zygomyia bifasciola Matile, 1989
- Zygomyia bivittata Tonnoir, 1927
- Zygomyia brunnea Tonnoir, 1927
- Zygomyia costata Tonnoir, 1927
- Zygomyia crassicauda Tonnoir, 1927
- Zygomyia crassipyga Tonnoir, 1927
- Zygomyia diffusa Edwards, 1927
- Zygomyia distincta Tonnoir, 1927
- Zygomyia egmontensis Zaitzev, 2002
- Zygomyia eluta Edwards, 1927
- Zygomyia filigera Edwards, 1927
- Zygomyia flavicoxa Marshall, 1896
- Zygomyia fusca Marshall, 1896
- Zygomyia grisescens Tonnoir, 1927
- Zygomyia guttata Tonnoir, 1927
- Zygomyia humeralis Tonnoir, 1927
- Zygomyia immaculata Tonnoir, 1927
- Zygomyia longicauda Tonnoir, 1927
- Zygomyia marginata Tonnoir, 1927
- Zygomyia multiseta Zaitzev, 2002
- Zygomyia nigrita Tonnoir, 1927
- Zygomyia nigriventris Tonnoir, 1927
- Zygomyia nigrohalterata Tonnoir, 1927
- Zygomyia obsoleta Tonnoir, 1927
- Zygomyia ovata Zaitzev, 2002
- Zygomyia penicillata Edwards, 1927
- Zygomyia ruficollis Tonnoir, 1927
- Zygomyia rufithorax Tonnoir, 1927
- Zygomyia similis Tonnoir, 1927
- Zygomyia submarginata Harrison, 1955
- Zygomyia submarginata Zaitzev, 2002
- Zygomyia taranakiensis Zaitzev, 2002
- Zygomyia trifasciata Tonnoir, 1927
- Zygomyia trispinosa Zaitzev, 2002
- Zygomyia truncata Tonnoir, 1927
- Zygomyia unispinosa Tonnoir, 1927
- Zygomyia varipes Edwards, 1927

=== Psychodidae ===
- Ancyroaspis funebris (Hutton, 1902)
- Ancyroaspis multimaculata (Satchell, 1950)
- Brunettia novaezelandiae Satchell, 1950
- Brunettia novaezelandica Satchell, 1950
- Didicrum clarkei (Satchell, 1954)
- Didicrum claviatum (Satchell, 1950)
- Didicrum drepanatum (Satchell, 1950)
- Didicrum maurum (Satchell, 1950)
- Didicrum solitarium (Satchell, 1954)
- Didicrum triuncinatum (Satchell, 1950)
- Logima surcoufi (Tonnoir, 1922)
- Nemapalpus zelandiae Alexander, 1921
- Psychoda acutipennis Tonnoir, 1920
- Psychoda alternata Say, 1824
- Psychoda parthenogenetica Tonnoir, 1940
- Psychoda pseudoalternata Williams, 1946
- Psychoda solivaga Duckhouse, 1971
- Psychodocha brachyptera (Quate, 1964)
- Psychodocha campbellica (Quate, 1964)
- Psychodocha cinerea Banks, 1894
- Psychodocha eremita (Quate, 1964)
- Psychodocha formosa (Satchell, 1954)
- Psychodocha inaequalis (Satchell, 1950)
- Psychodocha lloydi (Satchell, 1950)
- Psychodocha novaezealandica (Satchell, 1950)
- Psychodocha penicillata (Satchell, 1950)
- Psychodocha pulchrima (Satchell, 1954)
- Psychodocha setistyla (Satchell, 1950)
- Psychodocha simplex (Satchell, 1954)
- Psychodocha squamulata (Satchell, 1950)
- Psychodocha triaciculata (Satchell, 1950)
- Psychodocha tridens (Satchell, 1954)
- Psychodocha zonata (Satchell, 1950)
- Psychodula harrisi (Satchell, 1950)
- Satchellomyia barbata (Satchell, 1954)
- Satchellomyia bifalcata (Satchell, 1950)
- Satchellomyia bilobata (Satchell, 1954)
- Satchellomyia diffusa (Satchell, 1954)
- Satchellomyia gourlayi (Satchell, 1950)
- Satchellomyia lobisterna (Satchell, 1950)
- Satchellomyia serratipenis (Satchell, 1950)
- Satchellomyia spiralifera (Satchell, 1950)
- Sycorax cryptella Satchell, 1950
- Sycorax dispar Satchell, 1950
- Sycorax impatiens Satchell, 1950
- Sycorax milleri Satchell, 1950
- Threticus philpotti (Satchell, 1950)
- Threticus tortuosus Duckhouse, 1971
- Trichomyia capsulata Duckhouse, 1980
- Trichomyia fusca Satchell, 1950

=== Rangomaramidae ===
- Anisotricha novaezelandiae (Tonnoir, 1927)
- Anisotricha similis Jaschhof, 2004
- Insulatricha catrinae Jaschhof, 2004
- Insulatricha chandleri Jaschhof, 2004
- Insulatricha hippai Jaschhof, 2004
- Ohakunea australiensis Colless, 1963
- Ohakunea bicolor Edwards, 1927
- Rangomarama edwardsi Jaschhof & Didham, 2002
- Rangomarama humboldti Jaschhof & Didham, 2002
- Rangomarama leopoldinae Jaschhof & Didham, 2002
- Rangomarama matilei Jaschhof & Didham, 2002
- Rangomarama tonnoiri Jaschhof & Didham, 2002

=== Scatopsidae ===
- Anapausis stapedifortmis Freeman, 1989
- Anapausis zealandica Freeman, 1989
- Coboldia fuscipes (Meigen, 1830)
- Scatopse notata (Linnaeus, 1758)

=== Sciaridae ===
- Bradysia amoena (Winnertz, 1867)
- Bradysia brunnipes (Meigen, 1804)
- Bradysia campbellensis Steffan, 1964
- Bradysia difformis Frey, 1948
- Bradysia novaeseelandiae Köhler & Mohrig, 2016
- Bradysia pallipes (Fabricus, 1787)
- Bradysia rubra (Harrison, 1955)
- Corynoptera aggregata Köhler & Mohrig, 2016
- Corynoptera ancylospina Mohrig, 1999
- Corynoptera basisetosa Mohrig, 1999
- Corynoptera coronospina Mohrig, 1999
- Corynoptera cowanorum Mohrig, 1999
- Corynoptera densisetosa Mohrig, 1999
- Corynoptera densospica Mohrig, 1999
- Corynoptera didymistyla Mohrig, 1999
- Corynoptera dividospica Mohrig, 1999
- Corynoptera expressospina Mohrig, 1999
- Corynoptera facticia Mohrig, 1999
- Corynoptera fatigans (Johannsen, 1912)
- Corynoptera filisetosa Mohrig, 1999
- Corynoptera filispica Mohrig, 1999
- Corynoptera fuscispica Mohrig, 1999
- Corynoptera harrisi (Edwards, 1927)
- Corynoptera hemisetosa Mohrig, 1999
- Corynoptera microsetosa Mohrig, 1999
- Corynoptera nigrospina Mohrig, 1999
- Corynoptera nigrotegminis Mohrig, 1999
- Corynoptera oririclausa Mohrig, 1999
- Corynoptera parasetosa Mohrig, 1999
- Corynoptera pentaspina Mohrig, 1999
- Corynoptera philpotti (Tonnoir, 1927)
- Corynoptera plasiosetosa Mohrig, 1999
- Corynoptera prinospina Mohrig, 1999
- Corynoptera priscospina Mohrig, 1999
- Corynoptera pronospica Mohrig, 1999
- Corynoptera propriospina Mohrig, 1999
- Corynoptera prosospina Mohrig, 1999
- Corynoptera psilospina Mohrig, 1999
- Corynoptera quasisetosa Mohrig, 1999
- Corynoptera semiaggregata Mohrig, 1999
- Corynoptera subantarctica Steffan, 1964
- Corynoptera tapleyi (Edwards, 1927)
- Corynoptera variospina Mohrig, 1999
- Cratyna zealandica Mohrig, 1999
- Ctenosciara constrictans (Edwards, 1927)
- Ctenosciara etorutao Köhler and Mohrig, 2016
- Ctenosciara griseinervis (Edwards, 1927)
- Ctenosciara hyalipennis (Meigen, 1804)
- Ctenosciara nigrostyla Mohrig, 1999
- Ctenosciara nudopterix Mohrig, 1999
- Ctenosciara ovalis (Edwards, 1927)
- Ctenosciara rufulenta (Edwards, 1927)
- Ctenosciara xanthonota (Edwards, 1927)
- Epidapus chaetovenosus Mohrig, 1999
- Epidapus ctenosciaroides Mohrig, 1999
- Epidapus espinosalus Mohrig, 1999
- Epidapus parvus Mohrig, 1999
- Lycoriella castanescens (Lengersdorf, 1940)
- Lycoriella ingenua (Dufour, 1839)
- Neophnyxia nelsonia Tonnoir, 1927
- Pseudolycoriella aotearoa Köhler, 2019
- Pseudolycoriella bispina Mohrig, 1999
- Pseudolycoriella breviseta Mohrig, 1999
- Pseudolycoriella dagae Köhler, 2019
- Pseudolycoriella dentitegmenta Köhler, 2019
- Pseudolycoriella fiordlandia Köhler, 2019
- Pseudolycoriella frederickedwardsi Köhler and Mohrig, 2016
- Pseudolycoriella gonotegmenta Köhler, 2019
- Pseudolycoriella hauta Köhler, 2019
- Pseudolycoriella huttoni Köhler, 2019
- Pseudolycoriella jaschhofi Köhler, 2019
- Pseudolycoriella jejuna (Edwards, 1927)
- Pseudolycoriella jejunella Köhler, 2019
- Pseudolycoriella kaikoura Köhler, 2019
- Pseudolycoriella macrotegmenta Mohrig, 1999
- Pseudolycoriella maddisoni Köhler, 2019
- Pseudolycoriella mahanga Köhler, 2019
- Pseudolycoriella nahenahe Köhler, 2019
- Pseudolycoriella orite Köhler, 2019
- Pseudolycoriella plicitegmenta Köhler, 2019
- Pseudolycoriella porehu Köhler, 2019
- Pseudolycoriella porotaka Köhler, 2019
- Pseudolycoriella puhihi Köhler, 2019
- Pseudolycoriella raki Köhler, 2019
- Pseudolycoriella robustotegmenta Köhler, 2019
- Pseudolycoriella subtilitegmenta Köhler, 2019
- Pseudolycoriella sudhausi Köhler, 2019
- Pseudolycoriella teo Köhler, 2019
- Pseudolycoriella tewaipounamu Köhler, 2019
- Pseudolycoriella tuakana Köhler, 2019
- Pseudolycoriella wernermohrigi Köhler, 2019
- Pseudolycoriella whakahara Köhler, 2019
- Pseudolycoriella whena Köhler, 2019
- Pseudolycoriella zealandica (Edwards, 1927)
- Scatopsciara unicalcarata (Edwards, 1927)
- Sciara marcilla (Hutton, 1902)
- Sciara neorufescens Miller, 1950
- Sciara zealandica Kieffer, 1910
- Scythropochroa nitida Edwards, 1927
- Starkomyia inexpecta Jaschhof, 2004
- Xylosciara brevipes Steffan, 1964
- Zygoneura contractans (Edwards, 1927)

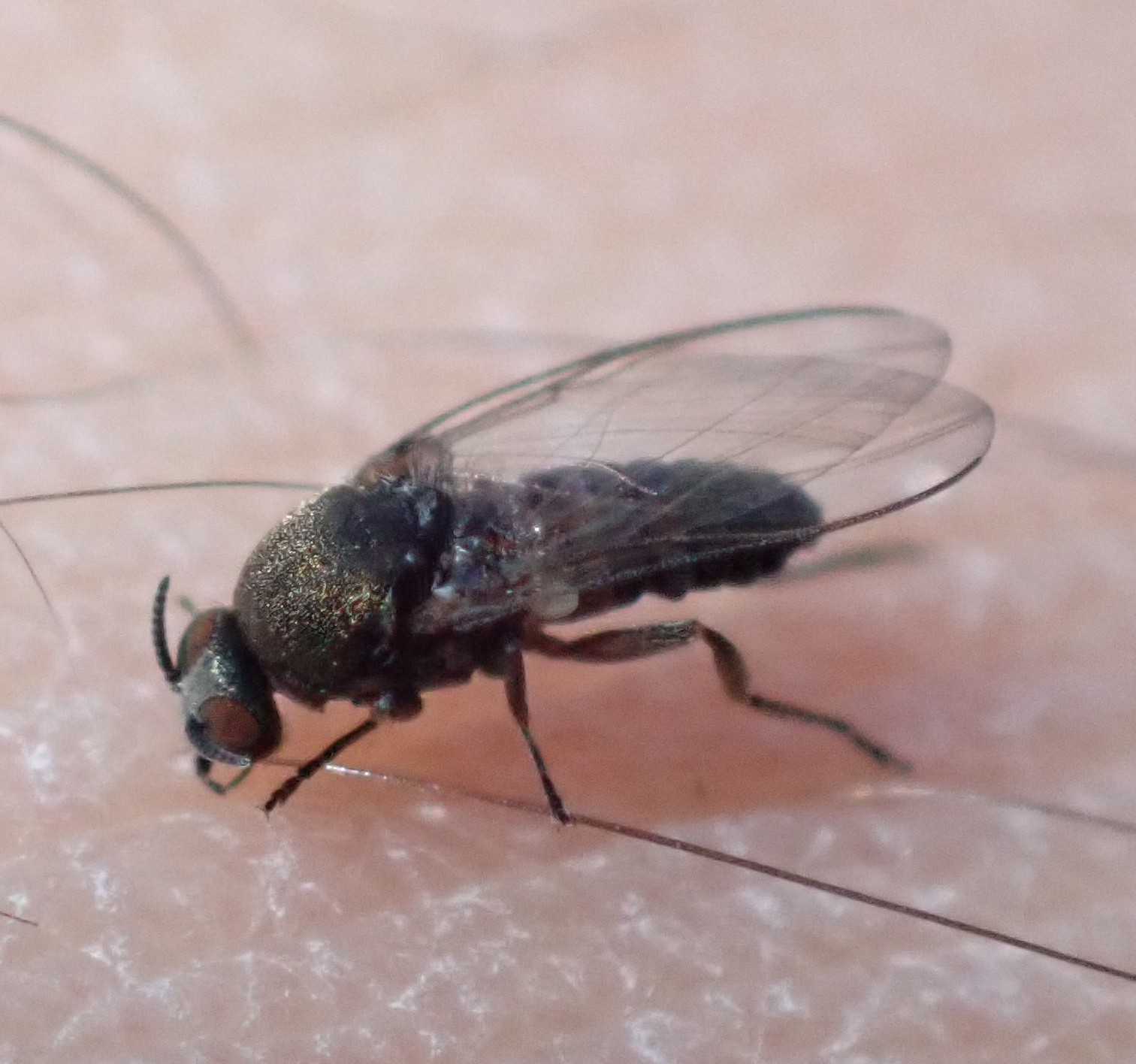
Austrosimulium australense

=== Simuliidae ===
- Austrosimulium albovelatum Dumbleton, 1973
- Austrosimulium alveolatum Dumbleton, 1973
- Austrosimulium australense (Schiner, 1868)
- Austrosimulium bicorne Dumbleton, 1973
- Austrosimulium campbellense Dumbleton, 1973
- Austrosimulium dugdalei Craig, Craig & Crosby, 2012
- Austrosimulium dumbletoni Crosby, 1976
- Austrosimulium extendorum Craig, Craig & Crosby, 2012
- Austrosimulium fiordense Dumbleton, 1973
- Austrosimulium laticorne Tonnoir, 1925
- Austrosimulium longicorne Tonnoir, 1925
- Austrosimulium multicorne Tonnoir, 1925
- Austrosimulium stewartense Dumbleton, 1973
- Austrosimulium tillyardianum Dumbleton, 1973
- Austrosimulium tonnoiri Craig, Craig & Crosby, 2012
- Austrosimulium ungulatum Tonnoir, 1925
- Austrosimulium unicorne Dumbleton, 1973
- Austrosimulium vailavoense Craig, Craig & Crosby, 2012
- Austrosimulium vexans (Mik, 1881)

=== Tanyderidae ===
- Mischoderus annuliferus (Hutton, 1900)
- Mischoderus forcipatus (Osten Sacken, 1880)
- Mischoderus marginatus (Edwards, 1923)
- Mischoderus neptunus (Edwards, 1923)
- Mischoderus varipes (Edwards, 1923)

=== Thaumaleidae ===
- Austrothaumalea appendiculata Tonnoir, 1927
- Austrothaumalea crosbyi McLellan, 1988
- Austrothaumalea gibbsi McLellan, 1988
- Austrothaumalea macfarlanei McLellan, 1988
- Austrothaumalea maxwelli McLellan, 1988
- Austrothaumalea neozelandica Tonnoir, 1927
- Austrothaumalea ngaire McLellan, 1988
- Austrothaumalea pala McLellan, 1988
- Austrothaumalea walkerae McLellan, 1988
- Austrothaumalea zwicki McLellan, 1988
- Oterere oliveri McLellan, 1988

=== Tipulidae ===
==== A–F ====
- Acantholimnophila bispina (Alexander, 1922)
- Acantholimnophila maorica (Alexander, 1922)
- Amphineurus bicinctus Edwards, 1923
- Amphineurus bicorniger Alexander, 1924
- Amphineurus blackballensis Alexander, 1953
- Amphineurus breviclavus Alexander, 1924
- Amphineurus cacoxenus Alexander, 1925
- Amphineurus campbelli Alexander, 1922
- Amphineurus cyathetanus Alexander, 1952
- Amphineurus edentulus Alexander, 1939
- Amphineurus fatuus (Hutton, 1902)
- Amphineurus fimbriatulus Alexander, 1925
- Amphineurus flexuosus Alexander, 1923
- Amphineurus gracilisentis Alexander, 1922
- Amphineurus harrisi Alexander, 1922
- Amphineurus hastatus Alexander, 1925
- Amphineurus horni Edwards, 1923
- Amphineurus hudsoni Edwards, 1923
- Amphineurus insulsus (Hutton, 1902)
- Amphineurus kingi Alexander, 1950
- Amphineurus longi Alexander, 1950
- Amphineurus lyriformis Alexander, 1923
- Amphineurus meridionalis Alexander, 1924
- Amphineurus minor Alexander, 1923
- Amphineurus molophilinus Alexander, 1922
- Amphineurus niveinervis Edwards, 1923
- Amphineurus nothofagi Alexander, 1925
- Amphineurus ochroplacus Alexander, 1925
- Amphineurus operculatus Alexander, 1924
- Amphineurus otagensis Alexander, 1922
- Amphineurus patruelis Alexander, 1925
- Amphineurus perarmatus Alexander, 1924
- Amphineurus perdecorus Edwards, 1923
- Amphineurus pressus Alexander, 1922
- Amphineurus pulchripes Alexander, 1925
- Amphineurus recurvans Alexander, 1922
- Amphineurus senex Alexander, 1922
- Amphineurus spinulistylus Alexander, 1925
- Amphineurus stewartiae Alexander, 1924
- Amphineurus subdecorus Edwards, 1924
- Amphineurus subfatuus Alexander, 1922
- Amphineurus subglaber Edwards, 1923
- Amphineurus submolophilinus Alexander, 1923
- Amphineurus tenuipollex Alexander, 1952
- Amphineurus tortuosus Alexander, 1923
- Amphineurus tumidus Alexander, 1923
- Aphrophila flavopygialis (Alexander, 1922)
- Aphrophila luteipes Alexander, 1926
- Aphrophila monacantha Alexander, 1926
- Aphrophila neozelandica (Edwards, 1923)
- Aphrophila tridentata Alexander, 1926
- Aphrophila trifida Alexander, 1926
- Aphrophila triton (Alexander, 1922)
- Aphrophila vittipennis Alexander, 1925
- Atarba connexa (Alexander, 1923)
- Atarba eluta (Edwards, 1923)
- Atarba filicornis Alexander, 1922
- Atarba viridicolor Alexander, 1922
- Aurotipula aperta (Edwards, 1923)
- Aurotipula atroflava (Alexander, 1922)
- Aurotipula auroatra (Edwards, 1923)
- Aurotipula bivittata (Edwards, 1923)
- Aurotipula brevitarsis (Edwards, 1923)
- Aurotipula clara (Kirby, 1884)
- Aurotipula dux (Kirby, 1884)
- Aurotipula ferruginosa (Edwards, 1923)
- Aurotipula flavidipennis (Alexander, 1923)
- Aurotipula flavoscapa (Alexander, 1922)
- Aurotipula occlusa (Edwards, 1924)
- Aurotipula orion (Hudson, 1895)
- Aurotipula ruapehuensis (Alexander, 1923)
- Austrolimnophila agathicola Alexander, 1952
- Austrolimnophila argus (Hutton, 1900)
- Austrolimnophila atripes (Alexander, 1922)
- Austrolimnophila chrysorrhoea (Edwards, 1923)
- Austrolimnophila crassipes (Hutton, 1900)
- Austrolimnophila cyatheti (Edwards, 1923)
- Austrolimnophila geographica (Hutton, 1900)
- Austrolimnophila lambi (Edwards, 1923)
- Austrolimnophila leucomelas (Edwards, 1923)
- Austrolimnophila marshalli (Hutton, 1900)
- Austrolimnophila nigrocincta (Edwards, 1923)
- Austrolimnophila obliquata (Alexander, 1922)
- Austrolimnophila oculata (Edwards, 1923)
- Austrolimnophila oriunda (Alexander, 1952)
- Austrolimnophila proximata (Alexander, 1926)
- Austrolimnophila stemma (Alexander, 1922)
- Austrolimnophila stewartiae (Alexander, 1924)
- Austrolimnophila strigimacula (Edwards, 1923)
- Austrolimnophila subinterventa (Edwards, 1923)
- Austrolimnophila wilfredlongi Alexander, 1952
- Austrotipula hudsoni Hutton, 1900
- Brevicera aenigmatica (Alexander, 1926)
- Brevicera heterogama (Hudson, 1913)
- Brevicera mesocera (Alexander, 1922)
- Brevicera waitakerensis (Alexander, 1952)
- Cerozodia hemiptera Alexander, 1922
- Cerozodia hudsoni Edwards, 1923
- Cerozodia laticosta (Alexander, 1930)
- Cerozodia paradisea Edwards, 1923
- Cerozodia plumosa Osten Sacken, 1888
- Cerozodia pulverulenta Edwards, 1923
- Cerozodia striata Edwards, 1923
- Cheilotrichia hamiltoni (Alexander, 1939)
- Chlorotipula albistigma (Edwards, 1923)
- Chlorotipula elongata (Edwards, 1923)
- Chlorotipula holochlora (Nowicki, 1875)
- Chlorotipula virescens (Edwards, 1923)
- Chlorotipula viridis (Walker, 1856)
- Ctenolimnophila alpina (Alexander, 1922)
- Ctenolimnophila brevitarsis (Alexander, 1926)
- Ctenolimnophila fulvipleura (Alexander, 1923)
- Ctenolimnophila fumipennis (Alexander, 1923)
- Ctenolimnophila harrisiana (Alexander, 1924)
- Ctenolimnophila pallipes (Alexander, 1926)
- Ctenolimnophila venustipennis (Alexander, 1925)
- Discobola ampla (Hutton, 1900)
- Discobola chathamica Alexander, 1924
- Discobola dicycla Edwards, 1923
- Discobola dohrni (Osten-Sacken, 1894)
- Discobola gibberina (Alexander, 1948)
- Discobola haetara Johns & Jenner, 2006
- Discobola tessellata (Osten-Sacken, 1894)
- Discobola venustula Alexander, 1929
- Dolichopeza atropos (Hudson, 1895)
- Dolichopeza fenwicki Alexander, 1923
- Dolichopeza howesi Alexander, 1922
- Dolichopeza parvicauda Edwards, 1923
- Elephantomyia ruapehuensis Alexander, 1923
- Elephantomyia zealandica Edwards, 1923

==== G–L ====
- Gonomyia banksiana Alexander, 1924
- Gonomyia bispina Alexander, 1924
- Gonomyia circumcincta Alexander, 1924
- Gonomyia longispina Alexander, 1922
- Gonomyia ludibunda Alexander, 1926
- Gonomyia nigrohalterata Edwards, 1923
- Gonomyia oliveri Alexander, 1924
- Gonomyia tenuistyla Alexander, 1926
- Gynoplistia aculeata Alexander, 1924
- Gynoplistia albicincta Edwards, 1923
- Gynoplistia ambulator Alexander, 1924
- Gynoplistia angustipennis Edwards, 1924
- Gynoplistia anthracina Alexander, 1920
- Gynoplistia arthuriana Edwards, 1923
- Gynoplistia auriantopyga Alexander, 1922
- Gynoplistia bicornis Alexander, 1924
- Gynoplistia bidentata Alexander, 1922
- Gynoplistia bilobata Alexander, 1923
- Gynoplistia bituberculata Alexander, 1923
- Gynoplistia bona Alexander, 1920
- Gynoplistia bucera Alexander, 1923
- Gynoplistia campbelli Alexander, 1922
- Gynoplistia canterburiana Edwards, 1923
- Gynoplistia chathamica Alexander, 1924
- Gynoplistia cladophora Alexander, 1922
- Gynoplistia clarkeana Alexander, 1951
- Gynoplistia clavipes Edwards, 1923
- Gynoplistia concava Alexander, 1922
- Gynoplistia conjuncta Edwards, 1923
- Gynoplistia cuprea Hutton, 1900
- Gynoplistia dactylophora Alexander, 1926
- Gynoplistia digitifera Alexander, 1953
- Gynoplistia dilatata Alexander, 1924
- Gynoplistia dimidiata Alexander, 1922
- Gynoplistia dispila Alexander, 1923
- Gynoplistia dispiloides Alexander, 1926
- Gynoplistia eluta Alexander, 1923
- Gynoplistia fimbriata Alexander, 1920
- Gynoplistia flavohalterata Alexander, 1926
- Gynoplistia formosa Hutton, 1900
- Gynoplistia fulgens Hutton, 1900
- Gynoplistia fuscoplumbea Edwards, 1923
- Gynoplistia generosa Alexander, 1926
- Gynoplistia glauca Edwards, 1923
- Gynoplistia hamiltoni Alexander, 1924
- Gynoplistia harrisi Alexander, 1922
- Gynoplistia heighwayi Alexander, 1930
- Gynoplistia hiemalis (Alexander, 1923)
- Gynoplistia hirsuticauda Alexander, 1923
- Gynoplistia hirtamera Alexander, 1922
- Gynoplistia hyalinata Alexander, 1923
- Gynoplistia incisa Edwards, 1923
- Gynoplistia inconjuncta Alexander, 1926
- Gynoplistia inflata Alexander, 1926
- Gynoplistia lobulifera Alexander, 1923
- Gynoplistia luteibasis Alexander, 1922
- Gynoplistia luteicincta Alexander, 1924
- Gynoplistia lyrifera Alexander, 1922
- Gynoplistia magnifica Edwards, 1923
- Gynoplistia moanae Alexander, 1951
- Gynoplistia myersae Alexander, 1924
- Gynoplistia nebulipennis Alexander, 1922
- Gynoplistia nebulosa Edwards, 1923
- Gynoplistia nematomera Alexander, 1926
- Gynoplistia neonebulosa Alexander, 1923
- Gynoplistia nigrobimbo Alexander, 1923
- Gynoplistia nigronitida Edwards, 1923
- Gynoplistia niveicincta Alexander, 1922
- Gynoplistia notabilis Alexander, 1926
- Gynoplistia notata Edwards, 1923
- Gynoplistia ocellifera Alexander, 1923
- Gynoplistia orophila Alexander, 1923
- Gynoplistia otagana Alexander, 1930
- Gynoplistia pallidistigma Alexander, 1923
- Gynoplistia pedestris Edwards, 1923
- Gynoplistia percara Alexander, 1926
- Gynoplistia persimilis Alexander, 1926
- Gynoplistia philpotti Alexander, 1939
- Gynoplistia pleuralis Alexander, 1923
- Gynoplistia plutonis Alexander, 1926
- Gynoplistia polita Edwards, 1923
- Gynoplistia princeps Alexander, 1923
- Gynoplistia purpurea Alexander, 1922
- Gynoplistia pygmaea Alexander, 1923
- Gynoplistia recurvata Alexander, 1923
- Gynoplistia resecta Edwards, 1924
- Gynoplistia romae Alexander, 1930
- Gynoplistia sackeni Alexander, 1920
- Gynoplistia serrulata Alexander, 1926
- Gynoplistia speciosa Edwards, 1923
- Gynoplistia speighti Edwards, 1923
- Gynoplistia spinicalcar Alexander, 1922
- Gynoplistia spinigera Alexander, 1922
- Gynoplistia splendens Alexander, 1922
- Gynoplistia subclavipes Alexander, 1924
- Gynoplistia subfasciata Walker, 1848
- Gynoplistia subformosa Alexander, 1924
- Gynoplistia subobsoleta Alexander, 1923
- Gynoplistia tridactyla Edwards, 1923
- Gynoplistia trifasciata Edwards, 1923
- Gynoplistia trispinosa Alexander, 1922
- Gynoplistia troglophila Alexander, 1962
- Gynoplistia tuberculata Edwards, 1923
- Gynoplistia unimaculata Alexander, 1922
- Gynoplistia vexator Alexander, 1952
- Gynoplistia violacea Edwards, 1923
- Gynoplistia vittinervis Alexander, 1924
- Gynoplistia waitakerensis Alexander, 1952
- Gynoplistia wakefieldi Westwood, 1881
- Harrisomyia bicuspidata Alexander, 1923
- Harrisomyia terebrella Alexander, 1932
- Helius harrisi (Alexander, 1923)
- Heterolimnophila subtruncata Alexander, 1923
- Heterolimnophila truncata Alexander, 1922
- Idioglochina fumipennis (Butler, 1875)
- Idioglochina kronei (Mik, 1881)
- Leptotarsus albiplagia (Alexander, 1923)
- Leptotarsus alexanderi (Edwards, 1923)
- Leptotarsus amissionis (Alexander, 1952)
- Leptotarsus angusticosta (Alexander, 1923)
- Leptotarsus atridorsum (Alexander, 1922)
- Leptotarsus binotatus (Hutton, 1900)
- Leptotarsus campbelli (Alexander, 1923)
- Leptotarsus cinereus (Edwards, 1923)
- Leptotarsus cubitalis (Edwards, 1923)
- Leptotarsus decoratus (Edwards, 1923)
- Leptotarsus dichroithorax (Alexander, 1920)
- Leptotarsus fucatus (Hutton, 1900)
- Leptotarsus fumibasis (Edwards, 1923)
- Leptotarsus fuscolateratus (Alexander, 1922)
- Leptotarsus glaucocapillus (Alexander, 1952)
- Leptotarsus greyanus (Alexander, 1922)
- Leptotarsus halteratus (Alexander, 1923)
- Leptotarsus hudsonianus (Alexander, 1922)
- Leptotarsus huttoni (Edwards, 1923)
- Leptotarsus incertus (Edwards, 1923)
- Leptotarsus intermedius (Alexander, 1922)
- Leptotarsus longioricornis (Alexander, 1923)
- Leptotarsus lunatus (Hutton, 1900)
- Leptotarsus mesocerus (Alexander, 1922)
- Leptotarsus minor (Edwards, 1923)
- Leptotarsus minutissimus (Alexander, 1923)
- Leptotarsus monstratus (Alexander, 1924)
- Leptotarsus montanus (Hutton, 1900)
- Leptotarsus neali (Oosterbroek, 1989)
- Leptotarsus obliquus (Edwards, 1923)
- Leptotarsus obliteratus (Alexander, 1923)
- Leptotarsus obscuripennis (Kirby, 1884)
- Leptotarsus ohakunensis (Alexander, 1923)
- Leptotarsus pallidistigmus (Alexander, 1922)
- Leptotarsus pallidus (Hutton, 1900)
- Leptotarsus pedestris (Alexander, 1939)
- Leptotarsus rufibasis (Alexander, 1922)
- Leptotarsus rufiventris (Edwards, 1923)
- Leptotarsus sessilis (Alexander, 1924)
- Leptotarsus simillimus (Alexander, 1924)
- Leptotarsus sinclairi (Edwards, 1923)
- Leptotarsus submancus (Alexander, 1923)
- Leptotarsus submontanus (Edwards, 1923)
- Leptotarsus subobsoletus (Alexander, 1926)
- Leptotarsus subtenera (Alexander, 1922)
- Leptotarsus subvittatus (Alexander, 1939)
- Leptotarsus tapleyi (Alexander, 1923)
- Leptotarsus tenuifrons (Alexander, 1926)
- Leptotarsus variegatus (Edwards, 1923)
- Leptotarsus vittatus (Edwards, 1923)
- Leptotarsus vulpinus (Hutton, 1881)
- Leptotarsus zeylandiae (Alexander, 1920)
- Limnophila bryobia Mik, 1881
- Limnophila campbelliana Alexander, 1932
- Limnophila latistyla Alexander, 1923
- Limnophila luteicauda Alexander, 1924
- Limnophila mira Alexander, 1926
- Limnophila miroides Alexander, 1932
- Limnophila nebulifera Alexander, 1923
- Limnophila oliveri Alexander, 1923
- Limnophila perscita Alexander, 1926
- Limnophila platyna Alexander, 1952
- Limnophila quaesita Alexander, 1923
- Limnophila scitula Alexander, 1926
- Limnophila spissigrada Alexander, 1926
- Limnophila tonnoiri Alexander, 1926
- Limnophilella delicatula (Hutton, 1900)
- Limnophilella serotina (Alexander, 1922)
- Limonia acanthophallus (Alexander, 1924)
- Limonia aegrotans (Edwards, 1923)
- Limonia annulifera (Alexander, 1922)
- Limonia archeyi (Alexander, 1924)
- Limonia arthuriana (Alexander, 1924)
- Limonia brookesi (Edwards, 1923)
- Limonia chlorophylloides (Alexander, 1925)
- Limonia cinerella (Alexander, 1923)
- Limonia conulifera (Edwards, 1923)
- Limonia crassispina (Alexander, 1923)
- Limonia cuneipennis (Alexander, 1923)
- Limonia diversispina (Alexander, 1923)
- Limonia fasciata (Hutton, 1900)
- Limonia fulviceps (Alexander, 1925)
- Limonia fulvinota (Alexander, 1923)
- Limonia funesta (Alexander, 1922)
- Limonia gubernatoria (Alexander, 1924)
- Limonia hemimelas (Alexander, 1922)
- Limonia heteracantha (Alexander, 1923)
- Limonia hudsoni (Edwards, 1923)
- Limonia incompta (Alexander, 1922)
- Limonia insularis (Mik, 1881)
- Limonia kermadecensis Alexander, 1973
- Limonia lindsayi (Alexander, 1924)
- Limonia luteipes (Alexander, 1923)
- Limonia luteonitens (Edwards, 1923)
- Limonia maoriensis (Alexander, 1923)
- Limonia megastigmosa (Alexander, 1922)
- Limonia melina (Alexander, 1924)
- Limonia moesta (Alexander, 1923)
- Limonia monilicornis (Hutton, 1900)
- Limonia multispina (Alexander, 1922)
- Limonia nebulifera (Alexander, 1922)
- Limonia nelsoniana (Alexander, 1925)
- Limonia nephelodes (Alexander, 1922)
- Limonia nigrescens (Hutton, 1900)
- Limonia otagensis (Alexander, 1924)
- Limonia pendulifera (Alexander, 1923)
- Limonia pictithorax (Alexander, 1923)
- Limonia plurispina (Alexander, 1925)
- Limonia primaeva Alexander, 1929
- Limonia repanda (Edwards, 1923)
- Limonia reversalis (Alexander, 1922)
- Limonia seducta (Alexander, 1923)
- Limonia semicuneata (Alexander, 1924)
- Limonia sperata (Alexander, 1922)
- Limonia sponsa (Alexander, 1922)
- Limonia subfasciata (Alexander, 1924)
- Limonia subviridis (Alexander, 1922)
- Limonia sulphuralis (Edwards, 1923)
- Limonia tapleyi (Alexander, 1924)
- Limonia tarsalba (Alexander, 1922)
- Limonia tenebrosa (Edwards, 1923)
- Limonia torrens (Alexander, 1923)
- Limonia tricuspis (Alexander, 1923)
- Limonia tristigmata (Alexander, 1925)
- Limonia veenmani Oosterbroek, 1986
- Limonia vicarians (Schiner, 1868)
- Limonia waitakeriae Alexander, 1952
- Limonia weschei (Edwards, 1923)
- Limonia wilfredi Alexander, 1952
- Limonia wiseana Alexander, 1955

==== M–Z ====
- Maoritipula hudsoni (Alexander, 1924)
- Maoritipula maori (Alexander, 1920)
- Metalibnotes perhyalina (Alexander, 1973)
- Metalibnotes watti (Alexander, 1973)
- Metalimnophila alpina Alexander, 1926
- Metalimnophila apicispina (Alexander, 1923)
- Metalimnophila banksiana (Alexander, 1923)
- Metalimnophila greyana Alexander, 1926
- Metalimnophila howesi (Alexander, 1922)
- Metalimnophila integra Alexander, 1926
- Metalimnophila longi Alexander, 1952
- Metalimnophila mirifica (Alexander, 1922)
- Metalimnophila montivaga Alexander, 1926
- Metalimnophila nemocera (Alexander, 1923)
- Metalimnophila nigroapicata (Alexander, 1922)
- Metalimnophila palmata Alexander, 1932
- Metalimnophila penicillata (Alexander, 1922)
- Metalimnophila productella Alexander, 1926
- Metalimnophila protea Alexander, 1923
- Metalimnophila simplicis (Alexander, 1922)
- Metalimnophila unipuncta (Alexander, 1922)
- Metalimnophila yorkensis Alexander, 1926
- Molophilus abruptus Alexander, 1923
- Molophilus acanthus Alexander, 1923
- Molophilus aenigmaticus Alexander, 1925
- Molophilus analis Alexander, 1923
- Molophilus aucklandicus Alexander, 1923
- Molophilus banksianus Alexander, 1922
- Molophilus basispina Alexander, 1923
- Molophilus bidens Alexander, 1923
- Molophilus bifalcatus Alexander, 1925
- Molophilus brevinervis Alexander, 1923
- Molophilus campbellianus Alexander, 1924
- Molophilus coloratus Alexander, 1923
- Molophilus coronarius Alexander, 1952
- Molophilus crassistylus Alexander, 1952
- Molophilus cristiferus Alexander, 1950
- Molophilus cruciferus Alexander, 1922
- Molophilus curtivena Alexander, 1925
- Molophilus curvistylus Alexander, 1925
- Molophilus cyatheticolus Alexander, 1950
- Molophilus denticulatus Alexander, 1923
- Molophilus evanidus Alexander, 1923
- Molophilus flagellifer Alexander, 1922
- Molophilus flavidulus Alexander, 1923
- Molophilus flavomarginalis Alexander, 1923
- Molophilus gladiator Alexander, 1939
- Molophilus greyensis Alexander, 1925
- Molophilus harrisianus Alexander, 1925
- Molophilus heteracanthus Alexander, 1925
- Molophilus hexacanthus Alexander, 1924
- Molophilus hilaris Alexander, 1923
- Molophilus howesi Alexander, 1923
- Molophilus imberbis Alexander, 1923
- Molophilus improcerus Alexander, 1939
- Molophilus infantulus Edwards, 1923
- Molophilus inornatus Edwards, 1923
- Molophilus irregularis Alexander, 1923
- Molophilus jenseni Alexander, 1924
- Molophilus latipennis Alexander, 1923
- Molophilus lindsayi Alexander, 1922
- Molophilus longiclavus Alexander, 1924
- Molophilus luteipennis Alexander, 1923
- Molophilus luteipygus Alexander, 1922
- Molophilus macrocerus Alexander, 1922
- Molophilus macrophallus Alexander, 1925
- Molophilus morosus Alexander, 1923
- Molophilus multicinctus Edwards, 1923
- Molophilus multispinosus Alexander, 1923
- Molophilus myersi Alexander, 1925
- Molophilus niveicinctus Alexander, 1922
- Molophilus ohakunensis Alexander, 1923
- Molophilus oliveri Alexander, 1922
- Molophilus oppositus Alexander, 1923
- Molophilus pallidulus Alexander, 1925
- Molophilus parvulus Alexander, 1922
- Molophilus pediformis Alexander, 1925
- Molophilus perlucidus Alexander, 1950
- Molophilus phalacanthus Alexander, 1950
- Molophilus philpotti Alexander, 1922
- Molophilus pictipleura Alexander, 1922
- Molophilus picturatus Alexander, 1923
- Molophilus pilosulus Edwards, 1924
- Molophilus plagiatus Alexander, 1922
- Molophilus porrectus Alexander, 1925
- Molophilus pugnax Alexander, 1925
- Molophilus pulcherrimus Edwards, 1923
- Molophilus pullatus Alexander, 1924
- Molophilus quadrifidus Alexander, 1922
- Molophilus quinquespinosus Alexander, 1952
- Molophilus recisus Alexander, 1924
- Molophilus reduncus Alexander, 1925
- Molophilus remotus Alexander, 1923
- Molophilus repandus Alexander, 1923
- Molophilus satyr Alexander, 1925
- Molophilus secundus Alexander, 1923
- Molophilus semiermis Alexander, 1926
- Molophilus sepositus Alexander, 1923
- Molophilus speighti Alexander, 1939
- Molophilus stewartensis Alexander, 1924
- Molophilus sublateralis Alexander, 1922
- Molophilus submorosus Alexander, 1924
- Molophilus subscaber Alexander, 1952
- Molophilus subuliferus Alexander, 1925
- Molophilus sylvicolus Alexander, 1924
- Molophilus tanypus Alexander, 1922
- Molophilus tenuissimus Alexander, 1923
- Molophilus tenuistylus Alexander, 1923
- Molophilus terminans Alexander, 1922
- Molophilus tillyardi Alexander, 1922
- Molophilus tonnoiri Alexander, 1925
- Molophilus uniplagiatus Alexander, 1923
- Molophilus variegatus Edwards, 1923
- Molophilus verecundus Alexander, 1924
- Nealexandriaria conveniens (Walker, 1848)
- Notholimnophila exclusa (Alexander, 1922)
- Nothophila fuscana Alexander, 1922
- Nothophila nebulosa Alexander, 1922
- Paralimnophila kumarensis (Alexander, 1939)
- Paralimnophila skusei (Hutton, 1902)
- Pedicia arthuriana (Alexander, 1924)
- Pedicia furcata (Alexander, 1926)
- Pedicia novaezelandiae (Alexander, 1922)
- Rhabdomastix brunneipennis Alexander, 1926
- Rhabdomastix callosa Alexander, 1923
- Rhabdomastix monilicornis Alexander, 1926
- Rhabdomastix neozelandiae Alexander, 1922
- Rhabdomastix optata Alexander, 1923
- Rhabdomastix otagana Alexander, 1922
- Rhabdomastix sagana Alexander, 1925
- Rhabdomastix tonnoirana Alexander, 1934
- Rhabdomastix trichiata Alexander, 1923
- Rhabdomastix trilineata Alexander, 1939
- Rhabdomastix unilineata Alexander, 1939
- Rhabdomastix vittithorax Alexander, 1923
- Rhamphophila lyrifera Edwards, 1923
- Rhamphophila sinistra (Hutton, 1900)
- Sigmatomera rufa (Hudson, 1895)
- Symplecta antipodarum (Alexander, 1953)
- Symplecta brachyptera (Alexander, 1955)
- Symplecta campbellicola (Alexander, 1964)
- Symplecta confluens (Alexander, 1922)
- Symplecta inconstans (Alexander, 1922)
- Symplecta pilipes (Fabricius, 1787)
- Tasiocera aproducta Alexander, 1952
- Tasiocera bituberculata Alexander, 1924
- Tasiocera cervicula Alexander, 1925
- Tasiocera diaphana Alexander, 1932
- Tasiocera divaricata Alexander, 1932
- Tasiocera gourlayi (Alexander, 1922)
- Tasiocera longiana Alexander, 1952
- Tasiocera paulula (Alexander, 1923)
- Tasiocera semiermis Alexander, 1932
- Tasiocera tonnoirana Alexander, 1932
- Tasiocera tridentata (Alexander, 1922)
- Tasiocera triton Alexander, 1925
- Tinemyia margaritifera Hutton, 1900
- Tonnoiraptera neozelandica (Tonnoir, 1926)
- Toxorhina levis (Hutton, 1900)
- Toxorhina ochraceum (Edwards, 1923)
- Zaluscodes aucklandicus Lamb, 1909
- Zelandoglochina atrovittata (Alexander, 1922)
- Zelandoglochina canterburiana (Alexander, 1923)
- Zelandoglochina circularis (Alexander, 1924)
- Zelandoglochina circumcincta (Alexander, 1924)
- Zelandoglochina crassipes (Edwards, 1923)
- Zelandoglochina cubitalis (Edwards, 1923)
- Zelandoglochina decincta (Edwards, 1923)
- Zelandoglochina flavidipennis (Edwards, 1923)
- Zelandoglochina harrisi (Alexander, 1923)
- Zelandoglochina melanogramma (Edwards, 1923)
- Zelandoglochina myersi (Alexander, 1924)
- Zelandoglochina octava (Edwards, 1923)
- Zelandoglochina paradisea (Alexander, 1923)
- Zelandoglochina sublacteata (Edwards, 1923)
- Zelandoglochina unicornis (Alexander, 1923)
- Zelandoglochina unijuga (Alexander, 1923)
- Zelandomyia angusta (Alexander, 1923)
- Zelandomyia atridorsum Alexander, 1932
- Zelandomyia cinereipleura (Alexander, 1922)
- Zelandomyia deviata (Alexander, 1922)
- Zelandomyia otagensis (Alexander, 1923)
- Zelandomyia pallidula Alexander, 1924
- Zelandomyia penthoptera Alexander, 1924
- Zelandomyia pygmaea Alexander, 1923
- Zelandomyia ruapehuensis (Alexander, 1922)
- Zelandomyia tantula Alexander, 1926
- Zelandomyia watti (Alexander, 1922)
- Zelandotipula fulva (Hutton, 1900)
- Zelandotipula novarae (Schiner, 1868)
- Zelandotipula otagana (Alexander, 1922)

=== Trichoceridae ===
- Asdura decussata (Alexander, 1924)
- Asdura howesi (Alexander, 1923)
- Asdura lyrifera (Alexander, 1923)
- Asdura obtusicornis (Alexander, 1923)
- Nothotrichocera antarctica (Edwards, 1923)
- Nothotrichocera aucklandica Johns, 1975
- Nothotrichocera johnsi Krzeminska, 2006
- Trichocera annulata Meigen, 1818
- Zedura antipodum (Mik, 1881)
- Zedura aperta (Alexander, 1922)
- Zedura complicata (Alexander, 1924)
- Zedura curtisi (Alexander, 1924)
- Zedura dololabella Krzeminska, 2005
- Zedura harrisi (Alexander, 1924)
- Zedura lobifera (Alexander, 1922)
- Zedura macrotrichiata (Alexander, 1922)
- Zedura maori (Alexander, 1921)
- Zedura oparara (Krzeminska, 2001)
- Zedura tautuku (Krzeminska, 2003)

== Brachycera ==
=== Acroceridae ===
- Apsona muscaria Westwood, 1876
- Helle longirostris (Hudson, 1892)
- Helle rufescens Brunetti, 1926
- Ogcodes argigaster Schlinger, 1960
- Ogcodes brunneus (Hutton, 1881)
- Ogcodes consimilis Brunetti, 1926
- Ogcodes leptisoma Schlinger, 1960
- Ogcodes nitens (Hutton, 1901)
- Ogcodes paramonovi Schlinger, 1960
- Ogcodes similis Schlinger, 1960

=== Agromyzidae ===
- Cerodontha angustipennis Harrison, 1959
- Cerodontha australis Malloch, 1925
- Cerodontha sylvesterensis Spencer, 1976
- Cerodontha triplicata (Spencer, 1963)
- Chromatomyia syngenesiae Hardy, 1849
- Hexomyza coprosmae Spencer, 1976
- Liriomyza antipoda Harrison, 1976
- Liriomyza brassicae (Riley, 1885)
- Liriomyza chenopodii (Watt, 1924)
- Liriomyza citreifemorata (Watt, 1923)
- Liriomyza clianthi (Watt, 1923)
- Liriomyza craspediae Spencer, 1976
- Liriomyza flavocentralis (Watt, 1923)
- Liriomyza flavolateralis (Watt, 1923)
- Liriomyza hebae Spencer, 1976
- Liriomyza homeri Spencer, 1976
- Liriomyza lepidii Harrison, 1976
- Liriomyza oleariae Spencer, 1976
- Liriomyza penita Spencer, 1976
- Liriomyza plantaginella Spencer, 1976
- Liriomyza umbrina (Watt, 1923)
- Liriomyza umbrinella (Watt, 1923)
- Liriomyza umbrosa (Watt, 1923)
- Liriomyza urticae (Watt, 1924)
- Liriomyza vicina Spencer, 1976
- Liriomyza wahlenbergiae Spencer, 1976
- Liriomyza watti Spencer, 1976
- Melanagromyza senecionella Spencer, 1976
- Phytoliriomyza bicolorata Spencer, 1976
- Phytoliriomyza convoluta Spencer, 1976
- Phytoliriomyza cyatheae Spencer, 1976
- Phytoliriomyza flavopleura (Watt, 1923)
- Phytoliriomyza huttensis Spencer, 1976
- Phytoliriomyza tearohensis Spencer, 1976
- Phytomyza clematadi Watt, 1923
- Phytomyza costata Harrison, 1959
- Phytomyza improvisa Spencer, 1976
- Phytomyza lyalli Spencer, 1976
- Phytomyza plantaginis Goreau, 1851
- Phytomyza vitalbae Kaltenberg, 1872

=== Anthomyiidae ===
- Anthomyia punctipennis Wiedemann, 1830
- Botanophila jacobaeae (Hardy, 1872)
- Delia platura (Meigen, 1826)
- Delia urbana (Malloch, 1924)

=== Anthomyzidae ===
- Zealantha thorpei Roháček, 2007

=== Apsilocephalidae ===
- Kaurimyia thorpei Winterton & Irwin, 2008

=== Asilidae ===
- Cerdistus lascus (Walker, 1849)
- Cerdistus meridionalis (Hutton, 1901)
- Neoitamus bulbus (Walker, 1849)
- Neoitamus melanopogon (Schiner, 1868)
- Neoitamus smithii (Hutton, 1901)
- Neoitamus walkeri Daniels, 1989
- Sarapogon clarkii Hutton, 1901
- Saropogon antipodus Schiner, 1868
- Saropogon chathamensis Hutton, 1901
- Saropogon clarkii Hutton, 1901
- Saropogon discus (Walker, 1849)
- Saropogon extenuatus Hutton, 1901
- Saropogon fascipes Hutton, 1902
- Saropogon fugiens Hutton, 1901
- Saropogon hudsoni Hutton, 1901
- Saropogon proximus Hutton, 1901
- Saropogon viduus (Walker, 1849)
- Zosteria novaezealandica Daniels, 1987

=== Asteiidae ===
- Asteia crassinervis Malloch, 1930
- Asteia levis Hutton, 1902
- Asteia tonnoiri Malloch, 1930

=== Australimyzidae ===
- Australimyza anisotomae Harrison, 1953
- Australimyza australensis (Mik, 1881)
- Australimyza kaikoura Brake & Mathis, 2007
- Australimyza longiseta Harrison, 1959
- Australimyza salicorniae Harrison, 1959
- Australimyza setigera Harrison, 1959

=== Bombyliidae ===
- Tillyardomyia gracilis Tonnoir, 1927

=== Brachystomatidae ===
- Apalocnemis fumosa (Hutton, 1901)
- Apalocnemis simulans Collin, 1928
- Ceratomerus akatarawa Sinclair, 2017
- Ceratomerus alticolus Sinclair, 2017
- Ceratomerus aquilonius Sinclair, 2017
- Ceratomerus biseriatus Plant, 1991
- Ceratomerus brevifurcatus Plant, 1991
- Ceratomerus brevinervis Sinclair, 2017
- Ceratomerus burgersi Sinclair, 2017
- Ceratomerus collini Sinclair, 2017
- Ceratomerus crassinervis Malloch, 1931
- Ceratomerus curvatus Sinclair, 2017
- Ceratomerus dorsatus Collin, 1928
- Ceratomerus dugdalei Sinclair, 2017
- Ceratomerus earlyi Plant, 1991
- Ceratomerus exiguus Collin, 1928
- Ceratomerus flavus Plant, 1991
- Ceratomerus flexuosus Sinclair, 2017
- Ceratomerus fontinalis Sinclair, 2017
- Ceratomerus latinervis Sinclair, 2017
- Ceratomerus latipalpus Sinclair, 2017
- Ceratomerus lobipennis Sinclair, 2017
- Ceratomerus longifurcatus Collin, 1931
- Ceratomerus macfarlanei Sinclair, 2017
- Ceratomerus mangamuka Sinclair, 2017
- Ceratomerus mayae Sinclair, 2017
- Ceratomerus melaneus Plant, 1991
- Ceratomerus minutus Sinclair, 2017
- Ceratomerus mirandus Sinclair, 2017
- Ceratomerus montanus Sinclair, 2017
- Ceratomerus morrisi Sinclair, 2017
- Ceratomerus notatus Sinclair, 2017
- Ceratomerus ohakunensis Sinclair, 2017
- Ceratomerus oparara Sinclair, 2017
- Ceratomerus planti Sinclair, 2017
- Ceratomerus prodigiosus Collin, 1928
- Ceratomerus rivalis Sinclair, 2017
- Ceratomerus setifacies Sinclair, 2017
- Ceratomerus simplex Sinclair, 2017
- Ceratomerus spinosus Sinclair, 2017
- Ceratomerus tarsalis Plant, 1991
- Ceratomerus tonnoiri Sinclair, 2017
- Ceratomerus trivittatus Sinclair, 2017
- Ceratomerus virgatus Collin, 1928
- Ceratomerus vittatus Plant, 1991
- Ceratomerus wardi Sinclair, 2017
- Ceratomerus whirinaki Sinclair, 2017
- Glyphidopeza fluviatilis Sinclair, 1997
- Glyphidopeza longicornis Sinclair, 1997
- Gondwanamyia zealandica Sinclair and Brooks, 2016
- Icasma aequabilis Plant, 1990
- Icasma fascipennis Sinclair, 1997
- Icasma masneri Sinclair, 1997
- Icasma setosa Sinclair, 1997
- Icasma singularis Collin, 1928
- Sematopoda elata Collin, 1928
- Zealandicesa aequabilis (Plant, 1990)
- Zealandicesa fascipennis (Sinclair, 1997)
- Zealandicesa longicauda (Sinclair, 1997)
- Zealandicesa masneri (Sinclair, 1997)
- Zealandicesa setosa (Sinclair, 1997)
- Zealandicesa singularis (Collin, 1928)
- Zealandicesa tararua (Sinclair, 1997)

=== Calliphoridae ===
- Calliphora Fabricius, 1781
- Calliphora hilli Patton, 1925
- Calliphora quadrimaculata (Swederus, 1787)
- Calliphora stygia (Fabricius, 1782)
- Calliphora vicina Robineau-Desvoidy, 1830
- Chrysomya megacephala (Fabricius, 1794)
- Chrysomya rufifacies (Macquart, 1843)
- Hemipyrellia ligurriens (Wiedemann, 1830)
- Lucilia cuprina (Wiedemann, 1830)
- Lucilia sericata (Meigen, 1826)
- Pollenia advena Dear, 1986
- Pollenia aerosa Dear, 1986
- Pollenia antipodea Dear, 1986
- Pollenia astrictifrons Dear, 1986
- Pollenia atricoma Dear, 1986
- Pollenia atrifemur Malloch, 1930
- Pollenia commensurata Dear, 1986
- Pollenia consanguinea Dear, 1986
- Pollenia consectata Dear, 1986
- Pollenia cuprea Malloch, 1930
- Pollenia demissa (Hutton, 1901)
- Pollenia dysaethria Dear, 1986
- Pollenia dyscheres Dear, 1986
- Pollenia enetera Dear, 1986
- Pollenia eurybregma Dear, 1986
- Pollenia fulviantenna Dear, 1986
- Pollenia fumosa (Hutton, 1901)
- Pollenia hispida Dear, 1986
- Pollenia immanis Dear, 1986
- Pollenia insularis Dear, 1986
- Pollenia lativertex Dear, 1986
- Pollenia limpida Dear, 1986
- Pollenia nigripalpis Dear, 1986
- Pollenia nigripes Malloch, 1930
- Pollenia nigrisquama Malloch, 1930
- Pollenia notialis Dear, 1986
- Pollenia opalina Dear, 1986
- Pollenia oreia Dear, 1986
- Pollenia pernix (Hutton, 1901)
- Pollenia primaeva Dear, 1986
- Pollenia pseudorudis Rognes, 1985
- Pollenia pulverea Dear, 1986
- Pollenia sandaraca Dear, 1986
- Pollenia scalena Dear, 1986
- Pollenia uniseta Dear, 1986
- Ptilonesia auronotata (Macquart, 1855)
- Xenocalliphora antipodea (Hutton, 1902)
- Xenocalliphora clara Dear, 1986
- Xenocalliphora divaricata Dear, 1986
- Xenocalliphora eudypti (Hutton, 1902)
- Xenocalliphora flavipes (Lamb, 1909)
- Xenocalliphora hortona (Walker, 1849)
- Xenocalliphora neohortona (Miller, 1939)
- Xenocalliphora neozealandica (Murray, 1954)
- Xenocalliphora solitaria Dear, 1986
- Xenocalliphora vetusta Dear, 1986
- Xenocalliphora viridiventris Malloch, 1930

=== Canacidae ===
- Apetaenus australis (Hutton, 1902)
- Apetaenus littoreus (Hutton, 1902)
- Isocanace crosbyi Mathis, 1999
- Tethinosoma fulvifrons (Hutton, 1901)
- Zalea earlyi McAlpine, 2007
- Zalea horningi (Harrison, 1976)
- Zalea johnsi McAlpine, 2007
- Zalea lithax McAlpine, 2007
- Zalea mathisi McAlpine, 2007
- Zalea ohauorae McAlpine, 2007
- Zalea uda McAlpine, 2007
- Zalea wisei McAlpine, 2007

=== Chamaemyiidae ===
- Chamaemyia polystigma (Meigen, 1830)
- Leucopis tapiae Blanchard, 1964
- Pseudoleucopis benefica Malloch, 1930

=== Chloropidae ===
- Aphanotrigonum huttoni (Malloch, 1931)
- Apotropina quadriseta (Harrison, 1959)
- Apotropina shewelliana (Spencer, 1977)
- Apotropina sulae (Spencer, 1977)
- Apotropina tonnoiri (Sabrosky, 1955)
- Apotropina wisei (Harrison, 1959)
- Chlorops multisulcatus Malloch, 1931
- Chlorops occipitalis Malloch, 1931
- Conioscinella apterina Spencer, 1977
- Conioscinella badia (Hutton, 1901)
- Conioscinella chathamensis Spencer, 1977
- Conioscinella fulvithorax Spencer, 1977
- Conioscinella grandis Spencer, 1977
- Conioscinella speighti (Malloch, 1931)
- Conioscinella spenceri Nartshuk, 1993
- Dicraeus tibialis (Macquart, 1835)
- Diplotoxa anorbitalis Malloch, 1931
- Diplotoxa gemina Spencer, 1977
- Diplotoxa harrisoni Spencer, 1977
- Diplotoxa knighti Spencer, 1977
- Diplotoxa lineata Malloch, 1931
- Diplotoxa moorei (Salmon, 1939)
- Diplotoxa neozelandica Harrison, 1959
- Diplotoxa orbitalis Malloch, 1931
- Diplotoxa similis Spencer, 1977
- Diplotoxa stepheni Spencer, 1977
- Gaurax flavoapicalis (Malloch, 1931)
- Gaurax mesopleuralis (Becker, 1911)
- Gaurax neozealandicus (Malloch, 1931)
- Gaurax solidus Becker, 1910
- Hippelates insignificans (Malloch, 1931)
- Lieparella zentae Spencer, 1986
- Melanum neozelandicum Malloch, 1931
- Siphunculina breviseta Malloch, 1924
- Siphunculina montana Spencer, 1977
- Tricimba anglemensis Spencer, 1977
- Tricimba deansi (Malloch, 1931)
- Tricimba dugdalei Spencer, 1977
- Tricimba flaviseta Malloch, 1931
- Tricimba fuscipes Malloch, 1931
- Tricimba kuscheli (Spencer, 1977)
- Tricimba tinctipennis (Malloch, 1931)
- Tricimba walkerae (Spencer, 1977)
- Tricimba watti Spencer, 1977

=== Coelopidae ===
- Baeopterus philpotti (Malloch, 1933)
- Baeopterus robustus Lamb, 1909
- Chaetocoelopa huttoni Harrison, 1959
- Chaetocoelopa littoralis (Hutton, 1881)
- Coelopella curvipes (Hutton, 1902)
- Icaridion debile (Lamb, 1909)
- Icaridion nasutum Lamb, 1909
- Icaridion nigrifrons (Lamb, 1909)

=== Cryptochetidae ===
- Cryptochetum iceryae (Williston, 1888)

=== Cypselosomatidae ===
- Pseudopomyza antipoda (Harrison, 1955)
- Pseudopomyza aristata (Harrison, 1959)
- Pseudopomyza brevicaudata (Harrison, 1964)
- Pseudopomyza brevis (Harrison, 1976)
- Pseudopomyza flavitarsis (Harrison, 1959)
- Pseudopomyza neozelandica (Malloch, 1933)
- Pseudopomyza nigritarsis Yau and Marshall 2025

=== Dolichopodidae ===
- Abatetia robusta (Parent, 1933)
- Aphrosylopsis lineata Lamb, 1909
- Apterachalcus borboroides (Oldroyd, 1955)
- Australachalcus chaetifemoratus (Parent, 1933)
- Australachalcus luteipes (Parent, 1933)
- Australachalcus medius Parent, 1933
- Australachalcus minor (Parent, 1933)
- Australachalcus minusculus (Parent, 1933)
- Australachalcus minutus (Parent, 1933)
- Australachalcus nigroscutatus (Parent, 1933)
- Australachalcus relictus (Parent, 1933)
- Australachalcus separatus (Parent, 1933)
- Austrosciapus proximus (Parent, 1928)
- Brevimyia pulverea (Parent, 1933)
- Chrysotimus bilineatus Parent, 1933
- Chrysotimus lunulatus Parent, 1933
- Chrysotimus nigrichaetus (Parent, 1933)
- Chrysotimus scutatus Parent, 1933
- Chrysotus albisignatus Becker, 1924
- Chrysotus bellax Parent, 1933
- Chrysotus chaetipalpus Parent, 1933
- Chrysotus chaetoproctus Parent, 1933
- Chrysotus diversus Parent, 1933
- Chrysotus neoselandensis Parent, 1933
- Chrysotus uniseriatus Parent, 1933
- Chrysotus vicinus Parent, 1933
- Dactylonotus formosus (Parent, 1933)
- Diaphorus infumatus Parent, 1933
- Diaphorus obscurus Parent, 1933
- Diaphorus parapraestans Dyte, 1980
- Diaphorus stylifer Parent, 1933
- Diaphorus tetrachaetus Parent, 1933
- Filatopus ciliatus (Parent, 1933)
- Filatopus mirabilis (Parent, 1933)
- Filatopus ornatus Parent, 1933
- Halteriphorus mirabilis Parent, 1933
- Helichochaetus discifer Parent, 1933
- Hercostomus argentifacies Parent, 1933
- Hercostomus aurifacies Parent, 1933
- Hercostomus philpotti Parent, 1933
- Hercostomus pollinifrons Parent, 1933
- Hydrophorus praecox (Lehmann, 1822)
- Ischiochaetus lenis Parent, 1933
- Ischiochaetus ornatipes Parent, 1933
- Ischiochaetus rotundicornis Parent, 1933
- Ischiochaetus spinosus Parent, 1933
- Micromorphus albipes (Zetterstedt, 1843)
- Micropygus bifenestratus Parent, 1933
- Micropygus bipunctatus Parent, 1933
- Micropygus brevicornis Parent, 1933
- Micropygus brevithorax Parent, 1933
- Micropygus divergens Parent, 1933
- Micropygus inornatus Parent, 1933
- Micropygus lacustris Parent, 1933
- Micropygus nigripes Parent, 1933
- Micropygus puerulus Parent, 1933
- Micropygus pulchellus Parent, 1933
- Micropygus ripicola Parent, 1933
- Micropygus serratus Parent, 1933
- Micropygus striatus Parent, 1933
- Micropygus tarsatus Parent, 1933
- Micropygus transiens Parent, 1933
- Micropygus vagans Parent, 1932
- Naufraga hexachaeta (Parent, 1933)
- Ostenia robusta Hutton, 1901
- Paraclius aeotearoa Bickel, 2008
- Parentia anomalicosta Bickel, 1992
- Parentia aotearoa Bickel, 1992
- Parentia argentifrons Bickel, 1992
- Parentia calignosa Bickel, 1992
- Parentia chathamensis Bickel, 1992
- Parentia cilifoliata (Parent, 1933)
- Parentia defecta Bickel, 1992
- Parentia fuscata (Hutton, 1901)
- Parentia gemmata (Walker, 1849)
- Parentia griseicollis (Becker, 1924)
- Parentia insularis Bickel, 1992
- Parentia johnsi Bickel, 1992
- Parentia lyra Bickel, 1992
- Parentia magniseta Bickel, 1992
- Parentia malitiosa (Hutton, 1901)
- Parentia milleri (Parent, 1933)
- Parentia mobile (Hutton, 1901)
- Parentia modesta (Parent, 1933)
- Parentia nova (Parent, 1933)
- Parentia pukakiensis Bickel, 1992
- Parentia recticosta (Parent, 1933)
- Parentia restricta (Hutton, 1901)
- Parentia schlingeri Bickel, 1992
- Parentia titirangi Bickel, 1992
- Parentia tonnoiri (Parent, 1933)
- Parentia varifemorata Bickel, 1992
- Parentia whirinaki Bickel, 1992
- Scelloides armatus Parent, 1933
- Scelloides brunneifrons Parent, 1933
- Scelloides conspicuus Parent, 1933
- Scelloides fulvifrons Parent, 1933
- Scelloides maculatus Parent, 1933
- Scelloides ornatipes Parent, 1933
- Scelloides parcespinosus Parent, 1933
- Scelloides parvus Parent, 1933
- Scelloides pollinosus Parent, 1933
- Scelloides raptorius Parent, 1933
- Scelloides spinosus Parent, 1933
- Scelloides vicinus Parent, 1933
- Schoenophilus pedestris Lamb, 1909
- Scorpiurus aenescens Parent, 1932
- Scorpiurus aramoana Bickel & Kerr, 2018
- Scorpiurus thorpei Masunaga, 2017
- Sympycnus albinotatus Parent, 1933
- Sympycnus alchymicus (Parent, 1933)
- Sympycnus amplitarsus Parent, 1933
- Sympycnus brevicornis Parent, 1933
- Sympycnus campbelli Parent, 1933
- Sympycnus contemptus Parent, 1933
- Sympycnus distinctus Parent, 1933
- Sympycnus edwardsi Parent, 1933
- Sympycnus gracilipes Parent, 1933
- Sympycnus harrisi Parent, 1933
- Sympycnus humilis Parent, 1933
- Sympycnus ignavus Parent, 1933
- Sympycnus longicornis Parent, 1933
- Sympycnus longipilus Parent, 1933
- Sympycnus luteinotatus Parent, 1933
- Sympycnus modestus Parent, 1933
- Sympycnus normalis Parent, 1933
- Sympycnus ornatipes Parent, 1933
- Sympycnus ornatus Parent, 1933
- Sympycnus tenueciliatus Parent, 1933
- Syntormon aotearoa Bickel, 1999
- Tetrachaetus bipunctatus Parent, 1933
- Thinophilus campbellensis (Harrison, 1964)
- Thinophilus milleri Parent, 1933
- Thrypticus arahakiensis Bickel, 1992

=== Drosophilidae ===
- Drosophila busckii Coquillett, 1901
- Drosophila funebris (Fabricius, 1787)
- Drosophila hydei Sturtevant, 1921
- Drosophila immigrans Sturtevant, 1921
- Drosophila melanogaster Meigen, 1830
- Drosophila pseudoobscura Frolova, 1929
- Drosophila repleta Wollaston, 1858
- Drosophila simulans Sturtevant, 1919
- Scaptodrosophila enigma Malloch, 1927
- Scaptodrosophila kirki (Harrison, 1959)
- Scaptodrosophila neozelandica (Harrison, 1959)
- Scaptomyza elmoi Takada, 1970
- Scaptomyza flava Fallen, 1823
- Scaptomyza flavella Harrison, 1959
- Scaptomyza fuscitarsis Harrison, 1959

=== Empididae ===
- Abocciputa pilosa Plant, 1989
- Adipsomyia mutabilis (Collin, 1928)
- Adipsomyia stigmosa (Smith, 1964)
- Antipodromia radialis (Collin, 1928)
- Atrichopleura compitalis Collin, 1928
- Atrichopleura conjuncta Malloch, 1931
- Chelifera apicata Collin, 1928
- Chelifera fontinalis (Miller, 1923)
- Chelifera tacita Collin, 1928
- Chelifera tantula Collin, 1928
- Chelipoda abdita Collin, 1928
- Chelipoda abjecta Collin, 1928
- Chelipoda aritarita Plant, 2007
- Chelipoda atrocitas Plant, 2007
- Chelipoda australpina Plant, 2007
- Chelipoda brevipennis Plant, 2007
- Chelipoda consignata Collin, 1928
- Chelipoda cornigera Plant, 2007
- Chelipoda cycloseta Plant, 2007
- Chelipoda delecta Collin, 1928
- Chelipoda didhami Plant, 2007
- Chelipoda digressa Collin, 1931
- Chelipoda dominatrix Plant, 2007
- Chelipoda ferocitrix Plant, 2007
- Chelipoda fuscoptera Plant, 2007
- Chelipoda gracilis Plant, 2007
- Chelipoda inconspicua Collin, 1928
- Chelipoda interposita Collin, 1928
- Chelipoda lateralis Plant, 2007
- Chelipoda longicornis Collin, 1928
- Chelipoda macrostigma Plant, 2007
- Chelipoda mediolinea Plant, 2007
- Chelipoda mirabilis Collin, 1928
- Chelipoda moderata Collin, 1928
- Chelipoda modica Collin, 1928
- Chelipoda monorhabdos Plant, 2007
- Chelipoda oblata Collin, 1928
- Chelipoda oblinata Collin, 1928
- Chelipoda otiraensis (Miller, 1923)
- Chelipoda puhihuroa Plant, 2007
- Chelipoda rakiuraensis Plant, 2007
- Chelipoda rangopango Plant, 2007
- Chelipoda secreta Collin, 1928
- Chelipoda tainuia Plant, 2007
- Chelipoda tangerina Plant, 2007
- Chelipoda trepida Collin, 1928
- Chelipoda ultraferox Plant, 2007
- Chelipoda venatrix Plant, 2007
- Chimerothalassius ismayi Shamshev & Grootaert, 2002
- Chimerothalassius marshalli Brooks and Cumming, 2022
- Cladodromia futilis Collin, 1928
- Cladodromia insignita Collin, 1928
- Cladodromia inturbida (Collin, 1928)
- Cladodromia negata Collin, 1928
- Cladodromia soleata Collin, 1928
- Clinocera gressitti Smith, 1964
- Clinorhampha politella (Malloch, 1931)
- Doliodromia avita Collin, 1928
- Empidadelpha pokekeao Kerr and Tweed, 2021
- Empidadelpha propria Collin, 1928
- Empidadelpha torrentalis (Miller, 1923)
- Empis probata Collin, 1928
- Gynatoma atra Malloch, 1931
- Gynatoma continens Collin, 1928
- Gynatoma evanescens Collin, 1928
- Gynatoma pygmaea Collin, 1928
- Gynatoma quadrilineata Collin, 1928
- Gynatoma subfulva Collin, 1928
- Hemerodromia radialis Collin, 1928
- Hilara anisonychia Collin, 1928
- Hilara consanguinea Collin, 1928
- Hilara dracophylli Miller, 1923
- Hilara flavinceris Miller, 1923
- Hilara fossalis Miller, 1923
- Hilara hudsoni (Hutton, 1901)
- Hilara intuta Collin, 1928
- Hilara littoralis Miller, 1923
- Hilara macrura Collin, 1928
- Hilara philpotti Miller, 1913
- Hilara philpotti Miller, 1923
- Hilara retecta Collin, 1928
- Hilara spinulenta Collin, 1928
- Hilara urophora Collin, 1928
- Hilara urophylla Collin, 1928
- Hilara vector Miller, 1923 Miller, 1923
- Hilarempis argentella Collin, 1928
- Hilarempis benhami (Miller, 1913)
- Hilarempis brevistyla Collin, 1928
- Hilarempis cineracea Collin, 1928
- Hilarempis dichropleura Collin, 1928
- Hilarempis diversimana Collin, 1928
- Hilarempis huttoni Bezzi, 1904
- Hilarempis immota Collin, 1928
- Hilarempis kaiteriensis (Miller, 1913)
- Hilarempis longistyla Collin, 1928
- Hilarempis minthaphila Collin, 1928
- Hilarempis nigra Miller, 1923
- Hilarempis ochrozona Collin, 1928
- Hilarempis simillima Collin, 1928
- Hilarempis smithii (Hutton, 1901)
- Hilarempis subdita Collin, 1928
- Hilarempis subdita1 Collin, 1928 Collin, 1928
- Hilarempis trichopleura Collin, 1928
- Hilarempis uniseta Collin, 1928
- Hybomyia oliveri Plant, 1995
- Monodromia fragilis Collin, 1928
- Phyllodromia falcata Plant, 2005
- Phyllodromia flexura Plant, 2005
- Phyllodromia floridula Plant, 2005
- Phyllodromia nigricoxa Plant, 2005
- Phyllodromia proiecta Plant, 2005
- Phyllodromia scopulifera Collin, 1928
- Phyllodromia striata Collin, 1928
- Thinempis brouni (Hutton, 1901)
- Thinempis otakouensis (Miller, 1910)
- Thinempis takaka Bickel, 1996

=== Ephydridae ===
- Atissa suturalis Cresson, 1929
- Brachydeutera sydneyensis Malloch, 1924
- Ditrichophora flavitarsis (Tonnoir & Malloch, 1926)
- Eleleides chloris Cresson, 1948
- Ephydrella aquaria (Hutton, 1901)
- Ephydrella assimilis Tonnoir & Malloch, 1926
- Ephydrella bicolor Mathis & Zatwarnicki, 2025
- Ephydrella novaezealandiae Tonnoir & Malloch, 1926
- Ephydrella spathulata Cresson, 1935
- Ephydrella thermara Dumbleton, 1969
- Ephydrella thermarum Dumbleton, 1969
- Haloscatella balioptera Mathis, Zatwarnicki & Marris, 2004
- Haloscatella harrisoni Mathis, Zatwarnicki & Marris, 2004
- Haloscatella karekare Mathis, Zatwarnicki & Marris, 2004
- Hecamede granifera Thomson, 1869
- Hecamedoides affinis (Tonnoir & Malloch, 1926)
- Hyadina irrorata Tonnoir & Malloch, 1926
- Hyadina obscurifrons Tonnoir & Malloch, 1926
- Hydrellia acutipennis Harrison, 1959
- Hydrellia enderbii (Hutton, 1902)
- Hydrellia mareeba Bock, 1991
- Hydrellia novaezealandiae Harrison, 1959
- Hydrellia tritici Coquillett, 1903
- Hydrellia velutinifrons Tonnoir & Malloch, 1926
- Hydrellia williamsi Cresson, 1936
- Limnellia abbreviata (Harrison, 1976)
- Limnellia maculipennis Malloch, 1925
- Nostima duoseta Cresson, 1943
- Nostima kiwistriata Edmiston & Mathis, 2007
- Nostima negramaculata Edmiston & Mathis, 2007
- Parahyadina lacustris Tonnoir & Malloch, 1926
- Parydra neozelandica Tonnoir & Malloch, 1926
- Psilopa metallica (Hutton, 1901)
- Scatella acutipennis Harrison, 1964
- Scatella brevis Harrison, 1964
- Scatella nelsoni Tonnoir & Malloch, 1926
- Scatella nitidithorax Malloch, 1925
- Scatella nubeculosa Tonnoir & Malloch, 1926
- Scatella subvittata Tonnoir & Malloch, 1926
- Scatella tonnoiri Hendel, 1931
- Scatella unguiculata Tonnoir & Malloch, 1926
- Scatella vittithorax Malloch, 1925
- Zeros invenatus (Lamb, 1912)

=== Fanniidae ===
- Euryomma perigrinum (Meigen, 1826)
- Fannia albitarsis Stein, 1911
- Fannia anthracinalis Domínguez & Pont, 2014
- Fannia canicularis (Linnaeus, 1761)
- Fannia laqueorum Domínguez & Pont, 2014
- Fannia magnicornis Domínguez & Pont, 2014
- Fannia mangerensis Domínguez & Pont, 2014
- Fannia mercurialis Domínguez & Pont, 2014
- Fannia scalaris (Fabricius, 1794)
- Fannia triregnum Domínguez & Pont, 2014
- Zealandofannia mystacina Domínguez & Pont, 2014

=== Fergusoninidae ===
- Fergusonina metrosiderosi Taylor, 2007

=== Helcomyzidae ===
- Maorimyia bipunctata (Hutton, 1901)

=== Heleomyzidae ===
- Allophylina albitarsis Tonnoir & Malloch, 1927
- Allophylopsis bivittata Harrison, 1959
- Allophylopsis chathamensis Tonnoir & Malloch, 1927
- Allophylopsis distincta Tonnoir & Malloch, 1927
- Allophylopsis fulva (Hutton, 1901)
- Allophylopsis fuscipennis Tonnoir & Malloch, 1927
- Allophylopsis hudsoni (Hutton, 1901)
- Allophylopsis inconspicua Tonnoir & Malloch, 1927
- Allophylopsis laquei (Hutton, 1902)
- Allophylopsis lineata Tonnoir & Malloch, 1927
- Allophylopsis minuta Tonnoir & Malloch, 1927
- Allophylopsis obscura Tonnoir & Malloch, 1927
- Allophylopsis philpotti Tonnoir & Malloch, 1927
- Allophylopsis rufithorax Tonnoir & Malloch, 1927
- Allophylopsis scutellata (Hutton, 1901)
- Allophylopsis subscutellata Tonnoir & Malloch, 1927
- Aneuria angusta Harrison, 1959
- Aneuria bipunctata Malloch, 1930
- Aneuria imitatrix Malloch, 1930
- Aneuria sexpunctata Malloch, 1930
- Aneuria tripunctata Malloch, 1930
- Fenwickia affinis Harrison, 1959
- Fenwickia caudata Harrison, 1959
- Fenwickia claripennis Malloch, 1930
- Fenwickia hirsuta Malloch, 1930
- Fenwickia nuda Malloch, 1930
- Fenwickia similis Malloch, 1930
- Oecothea fenestralis (Fallen, 1820)
- Prosopantrum flavifrons (Tonnoir & Malloch, 1927)
- Tephrochlamys rufiventris (Meigen, 1830)
- Xeneura picata (Hutton, 1902)

=== Helosciomyzidae ===
- Dasysciomyza pseudosetuligera (Tonnoir & Malloch, 1928)
- Dasysciomyza setuligera (Malloch, 1922)
- Helosciomyza subalpina Tonnoir & Malloch, 1928
- Napaeosciomyza rara (Hutton, 1901)
- Napaeosciomyza spinicosta (Malloch, 1922)
- Napaeosciomyza subspinicosta (Tonnoir & Malloch, 1928)
- Polytocus costatus Harrison, 1976
- Polytocus spinicosta Lamb, 1909
- Scordalus femoratus (Tonnoir & Malloch, 1928)
- Xenosciomyza prima Tonnoir & Malloch, 1928
- Xenosciomyza turbotti Harrison, 1955

=== Hippoboscidae ===
- Melophagus ovinus (Linnaeus, 1758)
- Ornithoica exilis (Walker, 1861)
- Ornithoica stipituri (Schiner, 1868)
- Ornithomya nigricornis Erichson, 1842
- Ornithomya variegata Bigot, 1885

=== Homalocnemidae ===
- Homalocnemis adelensis (Miller, 1913)
- Homalocnemis inexpleta Collin, 1928
- Homalocnemis maculipennis Malloch, 1932
- Homalocnemis perspicua (Hutton, 1901)

=== Huttoninidae ===
- Huttonina abrupta Tonnoir & Malloch, 1928
- Huttonina angustipennis Tonnoir & Malloch, 1928
- Huttonina brevis Malloch, 1930
- Huttonina claripennis Harrison, 1959
- Huttonina elegans Tonnoir & Malloch, 1928
- Huttonina furcata Tonnoir & Malloch, 1928
- Huttonina glabra Tonnoir & Malloch, 1928
- Huttonina scutellaris Tonnoir & Malloch, 1928
- Prosochaeta prima Malloch, 1935

=== Hybotidae ===
- Atodrapetis infrapratula Plant, 1998
- Austropeza insolita (Collin, 1928)
- Chersodromia zelandica Rogers, 1982
- Hoplopeza pulcherrima (Bezzi, 1909)
- Isodrapetis excava Plant, 1999
- Isodrapetis hyalina Plant, 1999
- Isodrapetis nitidiuscula Plant, 1999
- Isodrapetis nitidula Collin, 1928
- Isodrapetis rauparaha Plant, 1999
- Isodrapetis spinositibia Plant, 1999
- Isodrapetis subpollinosa Collin, 1928
- Isodrapetis suda Collin, 1928
- Ngaheremyia fuscipennis Plant & Didham, 2006
- Oropezella antennata Collin, 1928
- Oropezella bifurcata Collin, 1928
- Oropezella diminuloruma Plant, 1989
- Oropezella loripes Plant, 1989
- Oropezella nigra (Miller, 1923)
- Oropezella tanycera Collin, 1928
- Oropezella trucispicata Plant, 1989
- Platypalpus ementitus (Collin, 1928)
- Platypalpus scambus (Collin, 1928)
- Platypalpus spatiosus (Collin, 1928)
- Pseudoscelolabes fulvescens (Miller, 1923)

=== Lauxaniidae ===
- Poecilohetaerella antennata Harrison, 1959
- Poecilohetaerella bilineata (Hutton, 1901)
- Poecilohetaerella dubiosa Tonnoir & Malloch, 1926
- Poecilohetaerella minuta (Tonnoir & Malloch, 1926)
- Poecilohetaerella punctatifrons (Tonnoir & Malloch, 1926)
- Poecilohetaerella scutellata Harrison, 1959
- Poecilohetaerella watti Tonnoir & Malloch, 1926
- Poecilohetaerus punctatifacies Tonnoir & Malloch, 1926
- Sapromyza arenaria Tonnoir & Malloch, 1926
- Sapromyza dichromata Walker, 1849
- Sapromyza neozelandica Tonnoir & Malloch, 1926
- Sapromyza persimillima Harrison, 1959
- Sapromyza simillima Tonnoir & Malloch, 1926
- Trypetisoma costatum (Harrison, 1959)
- Trypetisoma guttatum (Tonnoir & Malloch, 1926)
- Trypetisoma tenuipenne (Malloch, 1930)

=== Lonchopteridae ===
- Lonchoptera bifurcata (Fallen, 1810)

=== Muscidae ===
- Calliphoroides antennatis (Hutton, 1881)
- Coenosia algivora Hutton, 1901
- Coenosia rubriceps Hutton, 1901
- Exsul singularis Hutton, 1901
- Exsul tenuis Malloch, 1923
- Helina sexmaculata (Preyssler, 1791)
- Hydrotaea rostrata (Robineau-Desvoidy, 1830)
- Idiohelina nelsoni Malloch, 1929
- Idiohelina nubeculosa Malloch, 1921
- Idiohelina setifemur Malloch, 1929
- Limnohelina bivittata Malloch, 1930
- Limnohelina debilis (Hutton, 1901)
- Limnohelina dorsovittata Malloch, 1930
- Limnohelina grisea Malloch, 1930
- Limnohelina huttoni Malloch, 1930
- Limnohelina nelsoni Malloch, 1930
- Limnohelina nigripes Malloch, 1930
- Limnohelina smithii (Hutton, 1901)
- Limnohelina spinipes (Walker, 1849)
- Limnohelina uniformis Malloch, 1930
- Macrorchis meditata (Fallén, 1825)
- Millerina hudsoni Malloch, 1925
- Millerina nigrifemur Malloch, 1925
- Millerina pennata Malloch, 1925
- Millerina rapax (Hutton, 1901)
- Musca domestica Linnaeus, 1758
- Muscidae Genus novum 1 limpida (Hutton, 1901)
- Muscina stabulans (Fallén, 1817)
- Paracoenosia tonnoiri Malloch, 1938
- Paralimnophora depressa Lamb, 1909
- Paralimnophora filipennis (Lamb, 1909)
- Paralimnophora fumipennis (Lamb, 1909)
- Paralimnophora purgatoria (Hutton, 1901)
- Pygophora apicalis Schiner, 1868
- Spilogona albifrons Malloch, 1931
- Spilogona argentifrons Malloch, 1931
- Spilogona aucklandica (Hutton, 1902)
- Spilogona aureifacies Malloch, 1931
- Spilogona badia (Hutton, 1901)
- Spilogona brunneinota (Harrison, 1955)
- Spilogona brunneivittata (Harrison, 1955)
- Spilogona carbonaria (Hutton, 1901)
- Spilogona curvipes (Lamb, 1909)
- Spilogona dolosa (Hutton, 1901)
- Spilogona flaviventris Malloch, 1931
- Spilogona fuliginosa (Hutton, 1901)
- Spilogona fulvescens (Hutton, 1901)
- Spilogona fumicosta Malloch, 1931
- Spilogona insularis (Lamb, 1909)
- Spilogona lasiophthalma (Lamb, 1909)
- Spilogona latimana Malloch, 1931
- Spilogona maculipennis (Hutton, 1901)
- Spilogona melas (Schiner, 1868)
- Spilogona minuta (Harrison, 1955)
- Spilogona ordinata (Hutton, 1901)
- Spilogona sorenseni (Harrison, 1955)
- Spilogona tenuicornis (Malloch, 1923)
- Spilogona villosa (Hutton, 1902)
- Stomoxys calcitrans (Linnaeus, 1758)

=== Mystacinobiidae ===
- Mystacinobia zelandica Holloway, 1976

=== Oestridae ===
- Gasterophilus haemorrhoidalis (Linnaeus, 1758)
- Gasterophilus nasalis (Linnaeus, 1758)
- Hypoderma bovis (Linnaeus, 1758)
- Oestrus ovis Linnaeus, 1758

=== Oreogetonidae ===
- Heterophlebus maculipennis (Collin, 1928)
- Heterophlebus rostratus (Collin, 1928)
- Heterophlebus undulatus (Collin, 1928)
- Hydropeza agnetis Sinclair & McLellan, 2004
- Hydropeza akatarawa Sinclair & McLellan, 2004
- Hydropeza clarae Sinclair & McLellan, 2004
- Hydropeza daviesi Sinclair & McLellan, 2004
- Hydropeza longipennae (Miller, 1923)
- Hydropeza milleri Sinclair & McLellan, 2004
- Hydropeza paniculata Sinclair & McLellan, 2004
- Hydropeza tutoko Sinclair & McLellan, 2004
- Hydropeza vockerothi Sinclair & McLellan, 2004
- Hydropeza wardi Sinclair & McLellan, 2004

=== Pallopteridae ===
- Maorina apicalis (Walker, 1849)
- Maorina aristata Malloch, 1930
- Maorina bimacula Malloch, 1930
- Maorina gourlayi (Harrison, 1959)
- Maorina lamellata (Harrison, 1959)
- Maorina macronycha Malloch, 1930
- Maorina palpalis Malloch, 1930
- Maorina pseudoapicalis (Harrison, 1959)
- Maorina scutellata Malloch, 1930

=== Phoridae ===
- Antipodiphora austrophila (Schmitz, 1939)
- Antipodiphora brevicornis (Schmitz, 1939)
- Antipodiphora nana (Schmitz, 1939)
- Antipodiphora similicornis (Schmitz, 1939)
- Antipodiphora subarcuata (Schmitz, 1939)
- Antipodiphora tonnoiri (Schmitz, 1939)
- Aphiura breviceps Schmitz, 1939
- Beckerina polysticha Schmitz, 1939
- Bothroprosopa mirifica Schmitz, 1939
- Ceratoplatus fullerae Schmitz, 1939
- Diplonevra caudata Schmitz, 1939
- Distichophora crassimana Schmitz, 1939
- Dohrniphora cornuta (Bigot, 1857)
- Kierania grata Schmitz, 1939
- Macroselia longiseta Schmitz, 1939
- Megaselia castanea Bridarolli, 1937
- Megaselia comparabilis Schmitz, 1929
- Megaselia curtineura (Brues, 1909)
- Megaselia dolichoptera Bridarolli, 1937
- Megaselia dupliciseta Bridarolli, 1937
- Megaselia halterata (Wood, 1910)
- Megaselia impariseta Bridarolli, 1937
- Megaselia longinqua Bridarolli, 1937
- Megaselia lucida Bridarolli, 1937
- Megaselia rufipes (Meigen, 1804)
- Megaselia scalaris (Loew, 1866)
- Megaselia spiracularis Schmitz, 1938
- Metopina australiana Borgmeier, 1963
- Metopina climieorum Disney, 1994
- Minicosta mollyae Brown & Oliver, 2008
- Palpocrates obscurior Schmitz, 1939
- Palpocrates rufipalpis Schmitz, 1939
- Spiniphora bergistammii (Mik, 1864)
- Tarsocrates niger Schmitz, 1939
- Triphleba atripalpis Schmitz, 1939
- Triphleba fuscithorax Schmitz, 1939
- Triphleba rufithorax Schmitz, 1939
- Wharia willcocksorum Brown & Oliver, 2008

=== Piophilidae ===
- Piophila australis (Harrison, 1959)
- Piophila casei (Linnaeus, 1758)

=== Pipunculidae ===
- Cephalops libidinosus De Meyer, 1991
- Dasydorylas arthurianus (Tonnoir, 1925)
- Dasydorylas deansi (Tonnoir, 1925)
- Dasydorylas harrisi (Tonnoir, 1925)
- Tomosvaryella novaezelandiae (Tonnoir, 1925)

=== Platypezidae ===
- Microsania tonnoiri Collart, 1934

=== Platystomatidae ===
- Zealandortalis interrupta Malloch, 1930
- Zealandortalis philpotti Harrison, 1959

=== Psilidae ===
- Chamaepsila rosae (Fabricius, 1794)

=== Rhagionidae ===
- Chrysopilus nitidiventris Tonnoir, 1927

=== Sarcophagidae ===
- Oxysarcodexia varia (Walker, 1836)
- Sarcophaga bifrons Walker, 1853
- Sarcophaga crassipalpis Macquart, 1939
- Sarcophaga peregrina (Robineau-Desvoidy, 1830)
- Tricharaea brevicornis (Wiedemann, 1830)

=== Sciadoceridae ===
- Sciadocera rufomaculata White, 1916

=== Sciomyzidae ===
- Eulimnia milleri Tonnoir & Malloch, 1928
- Eulimnia philpotti Tonnoir & Malloch, 1928
- Limnia transmarina Schiner, 1868
- Neolimnia castanea (Hutton, 1904)
- Neolimnia diversa Tonnoir & Malloch, 1928
- Neolimnia irrorata Tonnoir & Malloch, 1928
- Neolimnia minuta Tonnoir & Malloch, 1928
- Neolimnia nitidiventris Tonnoir & Malloch, 1928
- Neolimnia obscura (Hutton, 1901)
- Neolimnia pepekeiti Barnes, 1979
- Neolimnia raiti Barnes, 1979
- Neolimnia repo Barnes, 1979
- Neolimnia sigma (Walker, 1849)
- Neolimnia striata (Hutton, 1904)
- Neolimnia tranquilla (Hutton, 1901)
- Neolimnia ura Barnes, 1979
- Neolimnia vittata Harrison, 1959

=== Sepsidae ===
- Lasionemopoda hirsuta (de Meijere, 1906)

=== Sphaeroceridae ===
- Biroina myersi (Richards, 1973)
- Coproica ferruginata (Stenhammar, 1855)
- Coproica hirticula Collin, 1956
- Coproica hirtula (Rondani, 1880)
- Howickia trilineata (Hutton, 1901)
- Ischiolepta pusilla (Fallén, 1820)
- Leptocera caenosa (Rondani, 1880)
- Minilimosina knightae (Harrison, 1959)
- Norrbomia sordida (Zetterstedt, 1847)
- Opacifrons maculifrons (Becker, 1907)
- Opalimosina mirabilis (Collin, 1902)
- Phthitia emarginata Marshall, 2009
- Phthitia empirica (Hutton, 1901)
- Phthitia lobocercus Marshall, 1992
- Phthitia notthomasi Marshall, 1992
- Phthitia plesiocerus Marshall, 2009
- Phthitia rennelli (Harrison, 1964)
- Phthitia thomasi (Harrison, 1959)
- Pullimosina heteroneura (Haliday, 1836)
- Pullimosina pullula (Zetterstedt, 1847)
- Rachispoda fuscipennis (Haliday, 1833)
- Spelobia bifrons (Stenhammar, 1855)
- Spelobia luteilabris (Rondani, 1880)
- Spelobia pseudosetaria (Duda, 1918)
- Sphaerocera curvipes Latreille, 1805
- Sphaeroceridae Genus novum mediospinosa (Duda, 1925)
- Telomerina flavipes (Meigen, 1830)
- Thoracochaeta alia Marshall & Roháček, 2000
- Thoracochaeta ancudensis (Richards, 1931)
- Thoracochaeta conglobata Marshall & Roháček, 2000
- Thoracochaeta harrisoni Marshall & Roháček, 2000
- Thoracochaeta imitatrix Marshall & Roháček, 2000
- Thoracochaeta mucronata Marshall & Roháček, 2000
- Thoracochaeta zealandica (Harrison, 1959)
- Trachyopella lineafrons Spuler, 1925

=== Stratiomyidae ===
- Australoberis amoena Lindner, 1958
- Australoberis refugians (Miller, 1917)
- Benhamyia alpina (Hutton, 1901)
- Benhamyia apicalis (Walker, 1849)
- Benhamyia hoheria (Miller, 1917)
- Benhamyia smaragdina Lindner, 1958
- Benhamyia straznitzkii (Nowicki, 1875)
- Berisina caliginosa (Miller, 1917)
- Berisina maculipennis Malloch, 1928
- Berisina saltusans (Miller, 1917)
- Boreoides tasmaniensis Bezzi, 1922
- Dysbiota parvula Lindner, 1958
- Dysbiota peregrina (Hutton, 1901)
- Exaireta spinigera (Wiedemann, 1830)
- Hermetia illucens (Linnaeus, 1758)
- Inopus rubriceps (Macquart, 1847)
- Neactina opposita (Walker, 1854)
- Neactina ostensackeni (Lindner, 1958)
- Neactina simmondsii (Miller, 1917)
- Odontomyia angusta Walker, 1854
- Odontomyia atrovirens Bigot, 1879
- Odontomyia australensis Schiner, 1868
- Odontomyia chathamensis Hutton, 1901
- Odontomyia chloris (Walker, 1854)
- Odontomyia collina Hutton, 1901
- Odontomyia fulviceps (Walker, 1854)
- Odontomyia neodorsalis (Miller, 1950)
- Tytthoberis cuprea (Hutton, 1901)
- Zealandoberis lacuans (Miller, 1917)
- Zealandoberis micans (Hutton, 1901)
- Zealandoberis substituta (Walker, 1854)
- Zealandoberis violacea (Hutton, 1901)

=== Syrphidae ===
- Allograpta atkinsoni (Miller, 1921)
- Allograpta dorsalis (Miller, 1924)
- Allograpta flavofaciens (Miller, 1921)
- Allograpta hirsutifera (Hull, 1949)
- Allograpta hudsoni (Miller, 1921)
- Allograpta pseudoropala (Miller, 1921)
- Allograpta ropala (Walker, 1849)
- Allograpta ventralis (Miller, 1921)
- Anu una Thompson, 2008
- Eristalinus aeneus (Scopali, 1763)
- Eristalis tenax (Linnaeus, 1758)
- Eumerus strigatus (Fallen, 1817)
- Eumerus tuberculatus Rondani, 1857
- Helophilus antipodus Schiner, 1868
- Helophilus campbelli (Miller, 1921)
- Helophilus campbellicus Hutton, 1902
- Helophilus cargilli Miller, 1911
- Helophilus chathamensis Hutton, 1901
- Helophilus cingulatus (Fabricius, 1775)
- Helophilus hectori Miller, 1924
- Helophilus hochstetteri Nowicki, 1875
- Helophilus ineptus Walker, 1849
- Helophilus montanus (Miller, 1921)
- Helophilus seelandicus (Gmelin, 1790)
- Helophilus taruensis (Miller, 1924)
- Heringia calcarata (Loew, 1866)
- Melangyna novaezealandiae (Macquart, 1855)
- Melanostoma fasciatum (Macquart, 1850)
- Merodon equestris (Fabricius, 1794)
- Orthoprosopa bilineata (Walker, 1849)
- Platycheirus antipoda (Hull, 1949)
- Platycheirus antipodus (Hull, 1949)
- Platycheirus captalis (Miller, 1924)
- Platycheirus clarkei Miller, 1921
- Platycheirus cunninghami (Miller, 1921)
- Platycheirus fulvipes (Miller, 1924)
- Platycheirus harrisi (Miller, 1921)
- Platycheirus howesii (Miller, 1921)
- Platycheirus huttoni Thompson, 1989
- Platycheirus leptospermi (Miller, 1921)
- Platycheirus lignudus Miller, 1921
- Platycheirus myersii (Miller, 1924)
- Platycheirus notatus (Bigot, 1884)
- Platycheirus ronanus (Miller, 1921)
- Psilota decessa (Hutton, 1901)
- Simosyrphus grandicornis (Macquart, 1842)

=== Tabanidae ===
- Aotearomyia adrel (Walker, 1850)
- Aotearomyia brevipalpis Krober, 1931
- Aotearomyia lerda (Walker, 1850)
- Aotearomyia milleri Mackerras, 1957
- Aotearomyia montana (Hutton, 1901)
- Aotearomyia ricardoae (Hutton, 1901)
- Dasybasis bratrankii (Nowicki, 1875)
- Dasybasis difficilis (Krober, 1931)
- Dasybasis loewi (Enderlein, 1925)
- Dasybasis nigripes (Krober, 1931)
- Dasybasis opla (Walker, 1850)
- Dasybasis sarpa (Walker, 1850)
- Dasybasis thereviformis Mackerras, 1957
- Dasybasis transversa (Walker, 1854)
- Dasybasis truncata (Walker, 1850)
- Dasybasis viridis (Hudson, 1892)
- Ectenopsis lutulenta (Hutton, 1901)

=== Tachinidae ===
- Altaia geniculata Malloch, 1938
- Asetulia nigropolita Malloch, 1938
- Austromacquartia claripennis (Malloch, 1932)
- Avibrissia longirostris Malloch, 1932
- Avibrissina brevipalpis Malloch, 1932
- Avibrissina laticornis Malloch, 1938
- Bothrophora lupina (Swederus, 1787)
- Calcager apertum Hutton, 1901
- Calcager dubius Malloch, 1938
- Calcageria incidens Curran, 1927
- Calcageria varians Malloch, 1938
- Calosia binigra (Malloch, 1938)
- Calotachina tricolor Malloch, 1938
- Campbellia campbelli Miller, 1923
- Campbellia cockaynei Miller, 1923
- Campbellia lancifer (Malloch, 1930)
- Campylia nudara Malloch, 1938
- Campylia temerarium (Hutton, 1901)
- Chaetophthalmus bicolor (Macquart, 1848)
- Chaetopletha centralis Malloch, 1938
- Erythronychia aliena Malloch, 1932
- Erythronychia aperta Malloch, 1932
- Erythronychia australiensis (Schiner, 1868)
- Erythronychia defecta Malloch, 1932
- Erythronychia grisea Malloch, 1932
- Erythronychia hirticeps Malloch, 1932
- Erythronychia minor Malloch, 1932
- Erythronychia princeps (Curran, 1927)
- Erythronychia velutina Malloch, 1932
- Evibrissa huttoni Malloch, 1931
- Genotrichia minor Malloch, 1938
- Genotrichia tonnoiri Malloch, 1938
- Gracilicera monticola (Malloch, 1938)
- Gracilicera pallipes (Malloch, 1938)
- Gracilicera politiventris (Malloch, 1938)
- Graphotachina sinuata Malloch, 1938
- Heteria appendiculata Malloch, 1930
- Heteria atripes Malloch, 1930
- Heteria extensa Malloch, 1930
- Heteria flavibasis Malloch, 1930
- Heteria plebeia Malloch, 1930
- Heteria punctigera Malloch, 1930
- Huttonobesseria verecunda (Hutton, 1901)
- Mallochomacquartia flavohirta (Malloch, 1938)
- Mallochomacquartia nigrihirta (Malloch, 1938)
- Mallochomacquartia vexata (Hutton, 1901)
- Medinella albifrons Malloch, 1938
- Medinella flavofemorata Malloch, 1938
- Medinella nigrifemorata Malloch, 1938
- Medinella varipes Malloch, 1938
- Microhystricia gourlayi Malloch, 1938
- Montanarturia dimorpha (Malloch, 1938)
- Neoerythronychia hirta Malloch, 1932
- Neotachina angusticornis Malloch, 1938
- Neotachina depressa Malloch, 1938
- Neotachina laticornis Malloch, 1938
- Neotachina obtusa Malloch, 1938
- Neotryphera atra Malloch, 1938
- Occisor atratus Malloch, 1938
- Occisor inscitus Hutton, 1901
- Occisor versutus Hutton, 1901
- Pales atrox (Hutton, 1901)
- Pales aurea (Hutton, 1904)
- Pales brouni (Hutton, 1904)
- Pales casta (Hutton, 1904)
- Pales clathrata (Nowicki, 1875)
- Pales efferata (Hutton, 1901)
- Pales exitiosa (Hutton, 1904)
- Pales feredayi (Hutton, 1901)
- Pales feredayi (Hutton, 1881)
- Pales funesta (Hutton, 1901)
- Pales inconspicua (Hutton, 1904)
- Pales marginata (Hutton, 1881)
- Pales marginata (Hutton, 1901)
- Pales nefaria (Hutton, 1901)
- Pales nyctemeriana (Hudson, 1883)
- Pales orasus (Walker, 1849)
- Pales perniciosa Hutton, 1901
- Pales tecta Hutton, 1904
- Pales usitata Hutton, 1901
- Peremptor egmonti (Hutton, 1901)
- Peremptor kumaraensis (Miller, 1913)
- Peremptor modicus (Hutton, 1901)
- Perrissina albiceps Malloch, 1938
- Perrissina brunniceps Malloch, 1938
- Perrissina crocea Malloch, 1938
- Perrissina variceps Malloch, 1938
- Perrissina xanthopyga Malloch, 1938
- Perrissinoides cerambycivorae Dugdale, 1962
- Phaoniella bifida Malloch, 1938
- Plagiomyia achaeta Malloch, 1938
- Plagiomyia alticeps Malloch, 1938
- Plagiomyia longicornis Malloch, 1938
- Plagiomyia longipes Malloch, 1938
- Plagiomyia turbida (Hutton, 1901)
- Platytachina angustifrons Malloch, 1938
- Platytachina atricornis Malloch, 1938
- Platytachina difficilis Malloch, 1938
- Platytachina latifrons Malloch, 1938
- Platytachina major Malloch, 1938
- Plethochaetigera fenwicki Malloch, 1938
- Plethochaetigera isolata Malloch, 1938
- Plethochaetigera setiventris Malloch, 1938
- Procissio albiceps Malloch, 1938
- Procissio cana Hutton, 1901
- Procissio lateralis Malloch, 1938
- Procissio milleri Malloch, 1938
- Procissio montana Hutton, 1901
- Proscissio albiceps Malloch, 1938
- Proscissio cana Hutton, 1901
- Proscissio lateralis Malloch, 1938
- Proscissio milleri Malloch, 1938
- Proscissio montana Hutton, 1901
- Prosenosoma greyi Malloch, 1938
- Protohystricia alcis (Walker, 1849)
- Protohystricia gourlayi (Tonnoir, 1935)
- Protohystricia huttoni Malloch, 1930
- Protohystricia orientalis (Schiner, 1868)
- Pygocalcager humeratum (Hutton, 1901)
- Senostoma rubricarinatum (Macquart, 1846)
- Tachina mestor Walker, 1849
- Tachina sosilus Walker, 1849
- Tachineo clarkii (Hutton, 1901)
- Triarthria setipennis (Fallén, 1810)
- Trichopoda pennipes (Fabricius, 1781)
- Trigonospila brevifacies (Hardy, 1934)
- Truphia grisea Malloch, 1930
- Trypherina grisea Malloch, 1938
- Uclesiella irregularis Malloch, 1938
- Veluta albicincta Malloch, 1938
- Wattia ferruginea Malloch, 1938
- Wattia petiolata Malloch, 1938
- Wattia sessilis Malloch, 1938
- Xenorhynchia peeli Malloch, 1938
- Zealandotachina infuscata Malloch, 1938
- Zealandotachina lamellata Malloch, 1938
- Zealandotachina latifrons Malloch, 1938
- Zealandotachina nigrifemorata Malloch, 1938
- Zealandotachina quadriseta Malloch, 1938
- Zealandotachina quadrivittata Malloch, 1938
- Zealandotachina setigera Malloch, 1938
- Zealandotachina subtilis (Hutton, 1901)
- Zealandotachina tenuis Malloch, 1938
- Zealandotachina varipes Malloch, 1938

=== Tephritidae ===
- Austrotephritis cassiniae (Malloch, 1931)
- Austrotephritis marginata (Malloch, 1931)
- Austrotephritis plebeia (Malloch, 1931)
- Austrotephritis thoracica (Malloch, 1931)
- Procecidochares alani Steyskal, 1974
- Procecidochares utilis Stone, 1947
- Sphenella fascigera (Malloch, 1931)
- Toxotrypana australis Blanchard, 1960
- Trupanea alboapicata Malloch, 1931
- Trupanea centralis Malloch, 1931
- Trupanea completa Malloch, 1931
- Trupanea dubia Malloch, 1931
- Trupanea extensa Malloch, 1931
- Trupanea fenwicki Malloch, 1931
- Trupanea vitiosa Foote, 1989
- Trupanea vittigera Malloch, 1931
- Trupanea watti Malloch, 1931
- Urophora cardui (Linnaeus, 1758)
- Urophora solstitialis (Linnaeus, 1758)
- Urophora stylata (Fabricius, 1775)

=== Teratomyzidae ===
- Teratomyza neozelandica Malloch, 1933

=== Therevidae ===
- Anabarhynchus acuminatus Lyneborg, 1992
- Anabarhynchus albipennis Lyneborg, 1992
- Anabarhynchus arenarius Lyneborg, 1992
- Anabarhynchus atratus Lyneborg, 1992
- Anabarhynchus atripes Lyneborg, 1992
- Anabarhynchus aureosericeus Kröber, 1932
- Anabarhynchus brevicornis Lyneborg, 1992
- Anabarhynchus brunninervis Kröber, 1932
- Anabarhynchus caesius Krober, 1912
- Anabarhynchus completus Lyneborg, 1992
- Anabarhynchus curvistylus Lyneborg, 1992
- Anabarhynchus diversicolor Lyneborg, 1992
- Anabarhynchus dugdalei Lyneborg, 1992
- Anabarhynchus dysmachiiformis Kröber, 1932
- Anabarhynchus embersoni Lyneborg, 1992
- Anabarhynchus exiguus Hutton, 1901
- Anabarhynchus farinosus Lyneborg, 1992
- Anabarhynchus femoralis Kröber, 1932
- Anabarhynchus fenwicki Lyneborg, 1992
- Anabarhynchus flaviventris Lyneborg, 1992
- Anabarhynchus fluviatilis Lyneborg, 1992
- Anabarhynchus fuscofemoratus Lyneborg, 1992
- Anabarhynchus gibbsi Lyneborg, 1992
- Anabarhynchus grossus Lyneborg, 1992
- Anabarhynchus harrisi Lyneborg, 1992
- Anabarhynchus hayakawai Lyneborg, 1992
- Anabarhynchus hudsoni Lyneborg, 1992
- Anabarhynchus huttoni Lyneborg, 1992
- Anabarhynchus indistinctus Lyneborg, 1992
- Anabarhynchus innotatus (Walker, 1856)
- Anabarhynchus lacustris Lyneborg, 1992
- Anabarhynchus lateripilosus Lyneborg, 1992
- Anabarhynchus latus Lyneborg, 1992
- Anabarhynchus limbatinervis Kröber, 1932
- Anabarhynchus longepilosus Lyneborg, 1992
- Anabarhynchus longipennis Kröber, 1932
- Anabarhynchus macfarlanei Lyneborg, 1992
- Anabarhynchus major Lyneborg, 1992
- Anabarhynchus maori Hutton, 1901
- Anabarhynchus megalopyge Lyneborg, 1992
- Anabarhynchus microphallus Lyneborg, 1992
- Anabarhynchus monticola Lyneborg, 1992
- Anabarhynchus nebulosus Hutton, 1901
- Anabarhynchus neglectus Kröber, 1932
- Anabarhynchus nigrofemoratus Kröber, 1932
- Anabarhynchus olivaceus Lyneborg, 1992
- Anabarhynchus ostentatus Lyneborg, 1992
- Anabarhynchus postocularis Lyneborg, 1992
- Anabarhynchus robustus Lyneborg, 1992
- Anabarhynchus ruficoxa Lyneborg, 1992
- Anabarhynchus rufobasalis Lyneborg, 1992
- Anabarhynchus schlingeri Lyneborg, 1992
- Anabarhynchus similis Lyneborg, 1992
- Anabarhynchus simplex Lyneborg, 1992
- Anabarhynchus spiniger Lyneborg, 1992
- Anabarhynchus spitzeri Lyneborg, 1992
- Anabarhynchus triangularis Lyneborg, 1992
- Anabarhynchus tricoloratus Lyneborg, 1992
- Anabarhynchus waitarerensis Lyneborg, 1992
- Anabarhynchus westlandensis Lyneborg, 1992
- Anabarhynchus wisei Lyneborg, 1992
- Ectinorhynchus castaneus (Hutton, 1901)
- Ectinorhynchus cupreus (Hutton, 1901)
- Ectinorhynchus furcatus Lyneborg, 1992
- Ectinorhynchus micans (Hutton, 1901)
- Megathereva albopilosa Lyneborg, 1992
- Megathereva atritibia Lyneborg, 1992
- Megathereva bilineata (Fabricius, 1775)
