= List of flower fly species of New Zealand =

The following is a list of hoverfly (Syrphidae) species recorded in New Zealand. This list is based on a list of New Zealand flower flies published by F. Christian Thompson in 2008. Currently the list consists of 37 endemic species, 1 native Oceanian species, and 5 introduced invasive species. Beyond this there are another 48 endemic species awaiting formal description.

== Subfamily Syrphinae ==
=== Tribe Bacchini ===
==== Genus Melanostoma Schiner ====
- Melanostoma fasciatum (Macquart, 1850)

==== Subgenus Eocheilosia Hull ====
- Platycheirus antipodus (Hull, 1949)
- Platycheirus captalis (Miller, 1924)
- Platycheirus clarkei Miller, 1921
- Platycheirus cunninghami (Miller, 1921)
- Platycheirus fulvipes (Miller, 1924)
- Platycheirus harrisi (Miller, 1921)
- Platycheirus howesii (Miller, 1921)
- Platycheirus huttoni Thompson, 1989
- Platycheirus leptospermi (Miller, 1921)
- Platycheirus lignudus Miller, 1921
- Platycheirus myersii (Miller, 1924)
- Platycheirus notatus (Bigot, 1884)
- Platycheirus ronanus (Miller, 1921)

=== Tribe Syrphini ===
==== Genus Allograpta Osten Sacken ====
- Allograpta atkinsoni (Miller, 1921)
- Allograpta dorsalis (Miller, 1924)
- Allograpta flavofaciens (Miller, 1921)
- Allograpta hirsutifera (Hull, 1949)
- Allograpta hollowayae Thompson & Thompson, 2010
- Allograpta hudsoni (Miller, 1921)
- Allograpta pseudoropala (Miller, 1921)
- Allograpta ropala (Walker, 1849)
- Allograpta schlingeri Thompson & Thompson, 2010
- Allograpta ventralis (Miller, 1921)

==== Genus Anu Thompson ====
- Anu una Thompson, 2008

==== Subgenus: Austrosyrphus Vockeroth ====
- Melangyna novaezelandiae (Macquart, 1855)

==== Genus Simosyrphus Bigot ====
- Simosyrphus grandicornis (Macquart, 1842) – widespread in Oceania

== Subfamily Eristalinae ==
=== Tribe Eristalini ===
==== Subgenus: Pilinasica Malloch ====
- Helophilus antipodus Schiner, 1868
- Helophilus campbelli (Miller, 1921)
- Helophilus campbellicus Hutton, 1902
- Helophilus cargilli Miller, 1911
- Helophilus chathamensis Hutton, 1901
- Helophilus cingulatus (Fabricius, 1775)
- Helophilus hectori Miller, 1924
- Helophilus hochstetteri (Nowicki, 1875)
- Helophilus ineptus Walker, 1849
- Helophilus montanus (Miller, 1921)
- Helophilus seelandicus (Gmelin, 1790)
- Helophilus taruensis Miller, 1924

==== Genus Eristalinus Rondani ====
- Eristalinus aeneus (Scopoli, 1763) – introduced

==== Genus Eristalis Latreille ====
- Eristalis tenax (Linnaeus, 1758) – introduced

=== Tribe Merodontini ===
==== Genus Eumerus Meigen ====
- Eumerus funeralis Meigen, 1822 – introduced
- Eumerus strigatus (Fallen, 1817) – introduced

==== Genus Merodon Meigen ====
- Merodon equestris (Fabricius, 1794) – introduced

==== Genus Psilota Meigen ====
- Psilota decessa (Hutton, 1901)

=== Tribe Milesiini ===
==== Subgenus: Paratropidia Hull ====
- Orthoprosopa bilineata (Walker, 1849)
