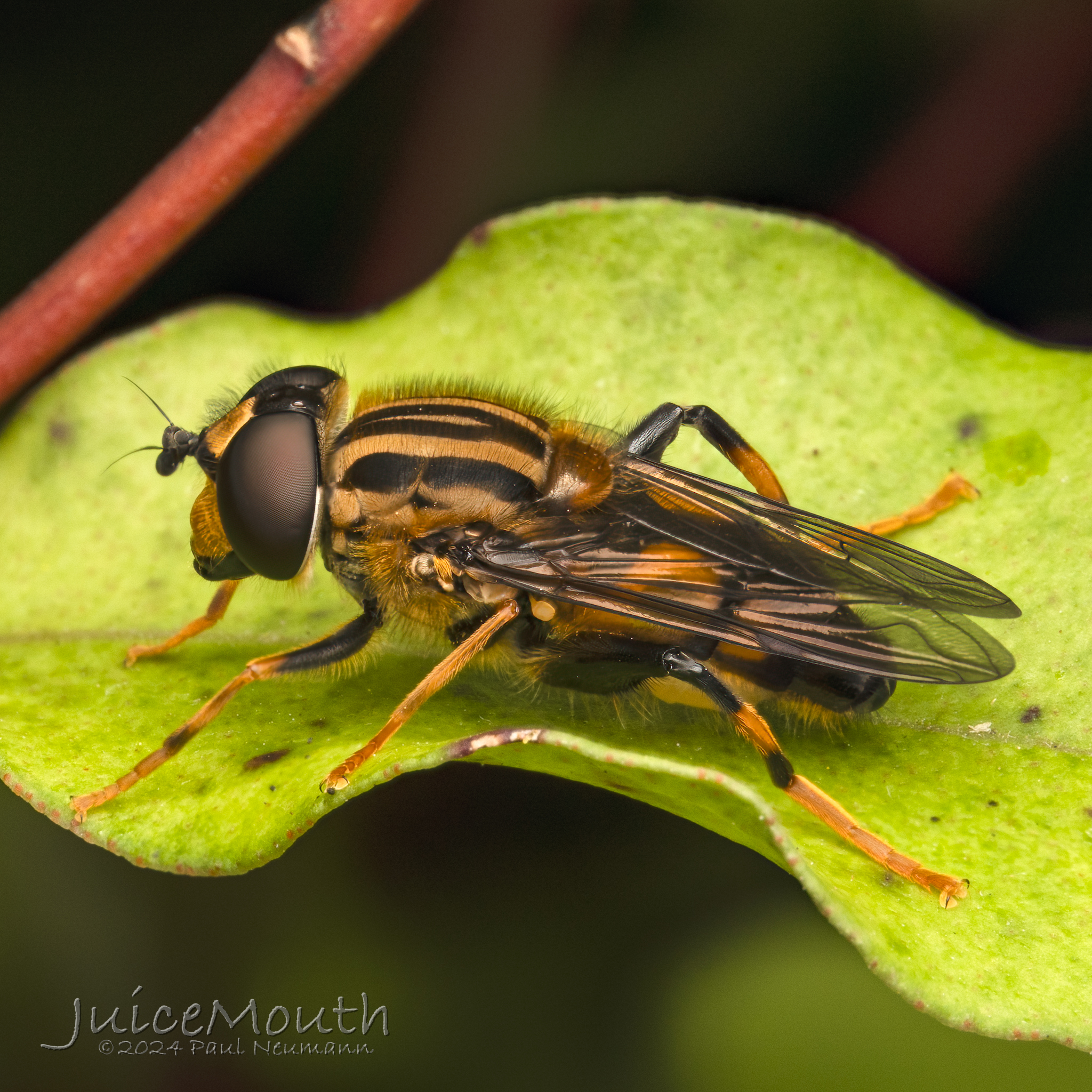
- Adult of Helophilus antipodus from North Island, New Zealand

Scientific classification
- Kingdom: Animalia
- Phylum: Arthropoda
- Clade: Pancrustacea
- Class: Insecta
- Order: Diptera
- Family: Syrphidae
- Genus: Helophilus
- Species: H. antipodus

Binomial name
- Helophilus antipodus Schiner, 1868
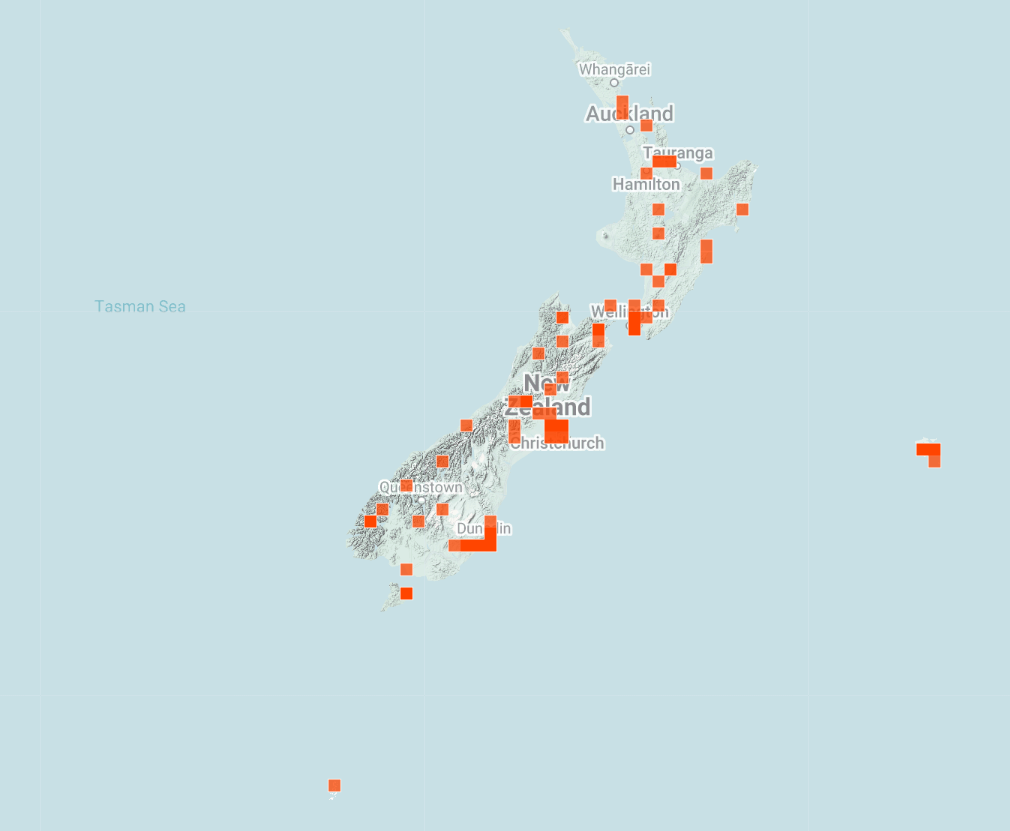
- Distribution map of Inaturalist H. antipodus sighting

Synonyms
- Helophilus interruptus Lamb, 1909; Helophilus vicinus Hutton, 1901

= Helophilus antipodus =

Species of insect

Helophilus antipodus is an endemic species of hoverfly observed throughout New Zealand . It belongs to the genus Helophilus in the family Syrphidae (flower flies). The adults are pollinators.

== Taxonomy ==
This species was first described by Schiner in 1868 from a single female from Auckland New Zealand. In 1901, Hutton named this species as Helophilus vicinus using male specimens from Chatham Islands. In 1909, Lamb used a female specimen from Campbell islands to describe Helophilus interruptus. In 1921, Miller clarified that there was just one species; Helophilus antipodus.

== Description ==
Front tibia is yellow, with a black ring at the end. Hind femur are all black. Wing-viens black, and slightly infusecate. Campared with Helophilus montanus, their Lateral ocelli is closer to eyes than to each other; oral margin is not strongly produced; they are larger and more robust flies. Similar in appearance to the New Zealand three-lined hoverfly (Helophilus seelandicus)

== Distribution ==
Helophilus antipodus is found over much of New Zealand including many subantartic Islands (Auckland Islands, Campbell islands).

On the mainland this fly is a pollinator of the endemic orchid Dendrobium cunninghamii.

== Gallery ==
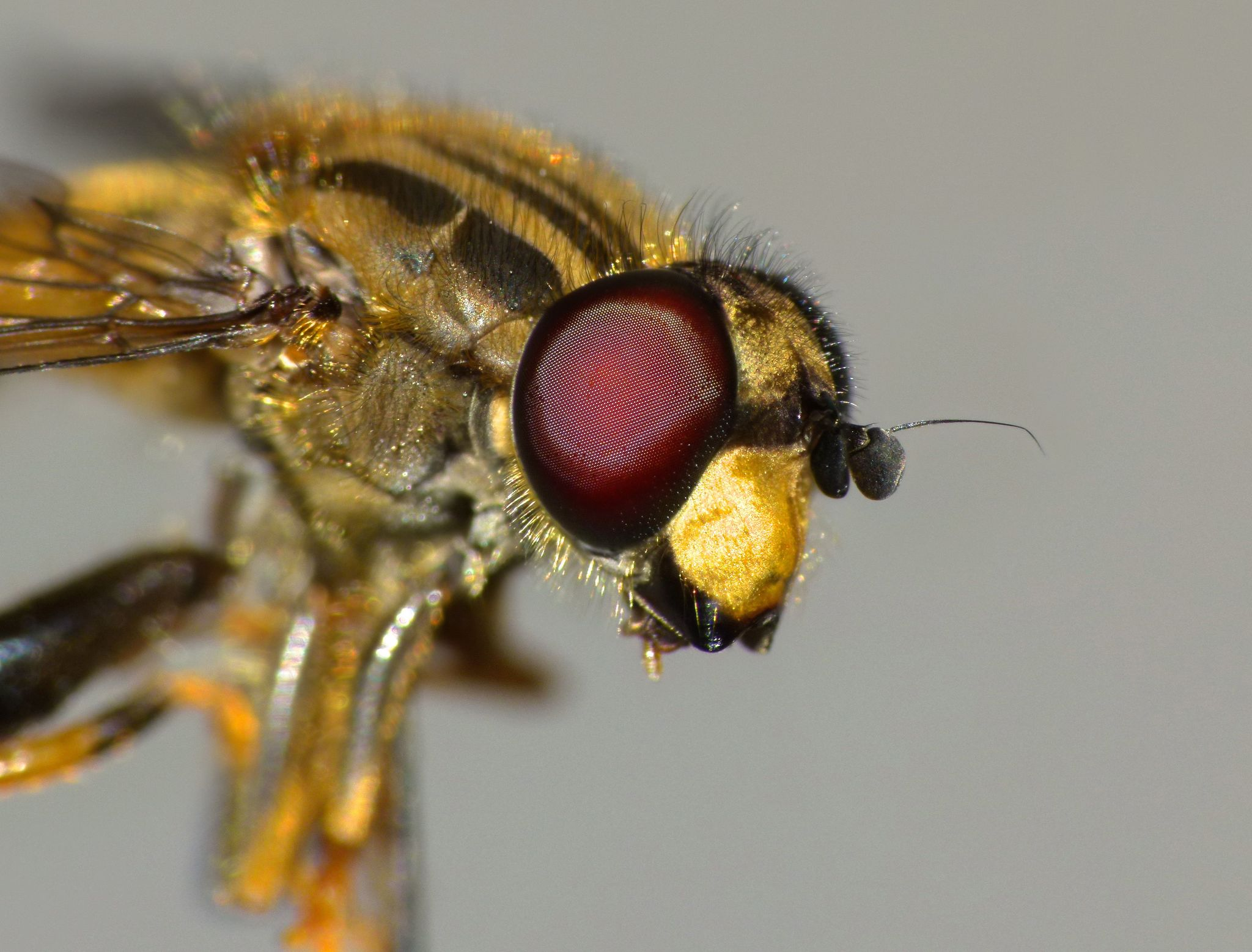
Compound eyes of Helophilus antipodus

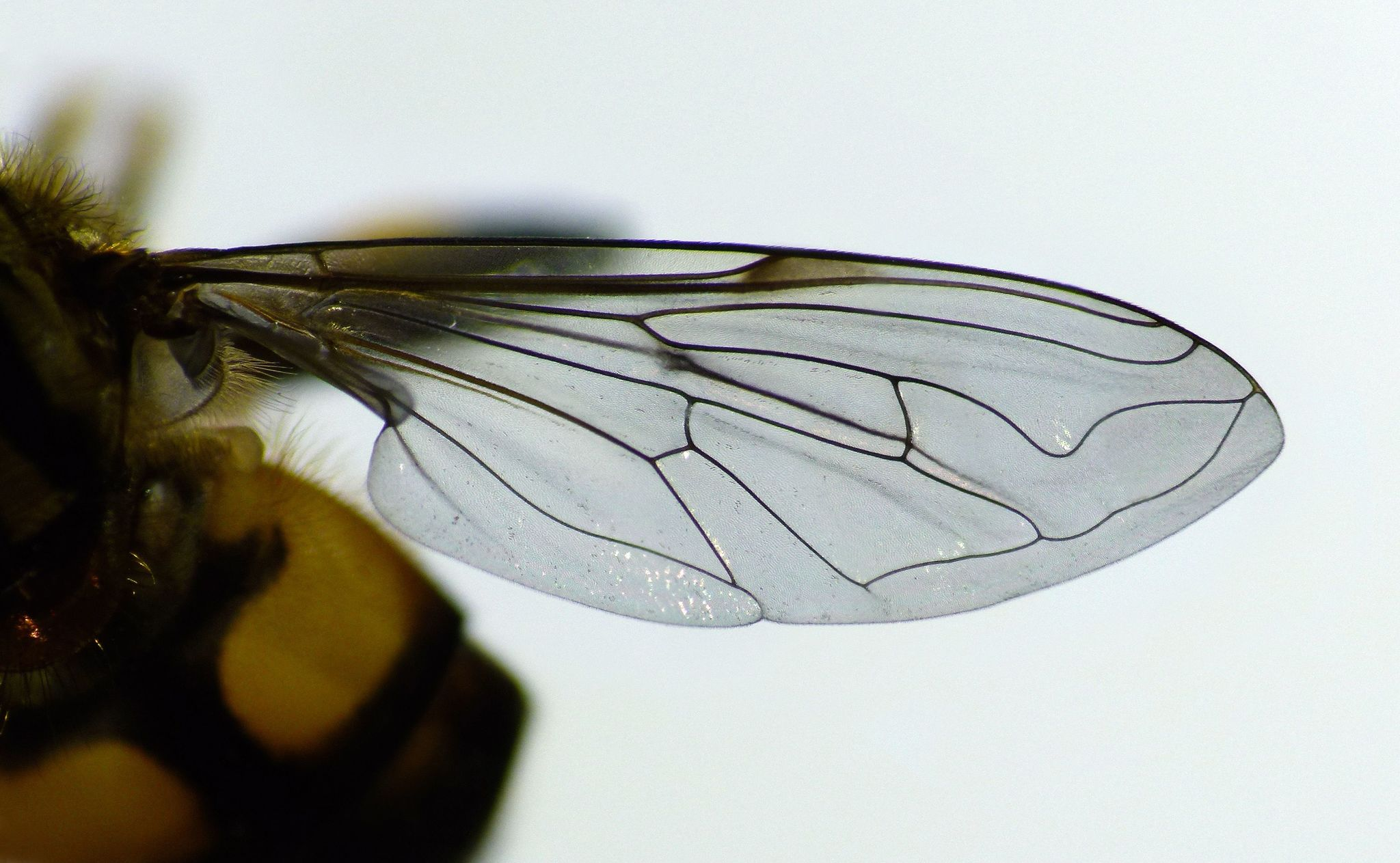
Wing of Helophilus antipodus

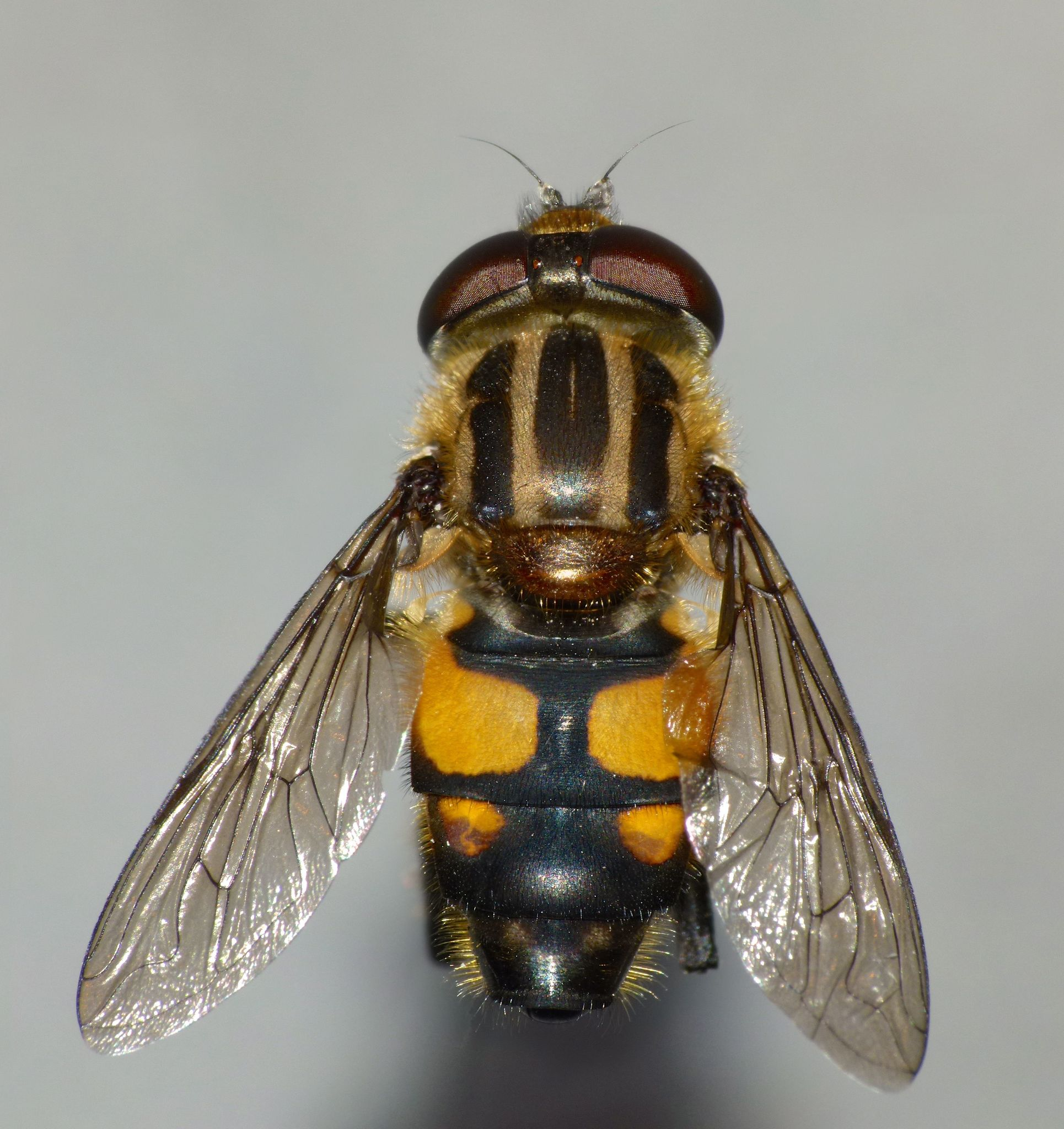
Back of Helophilus antipodus

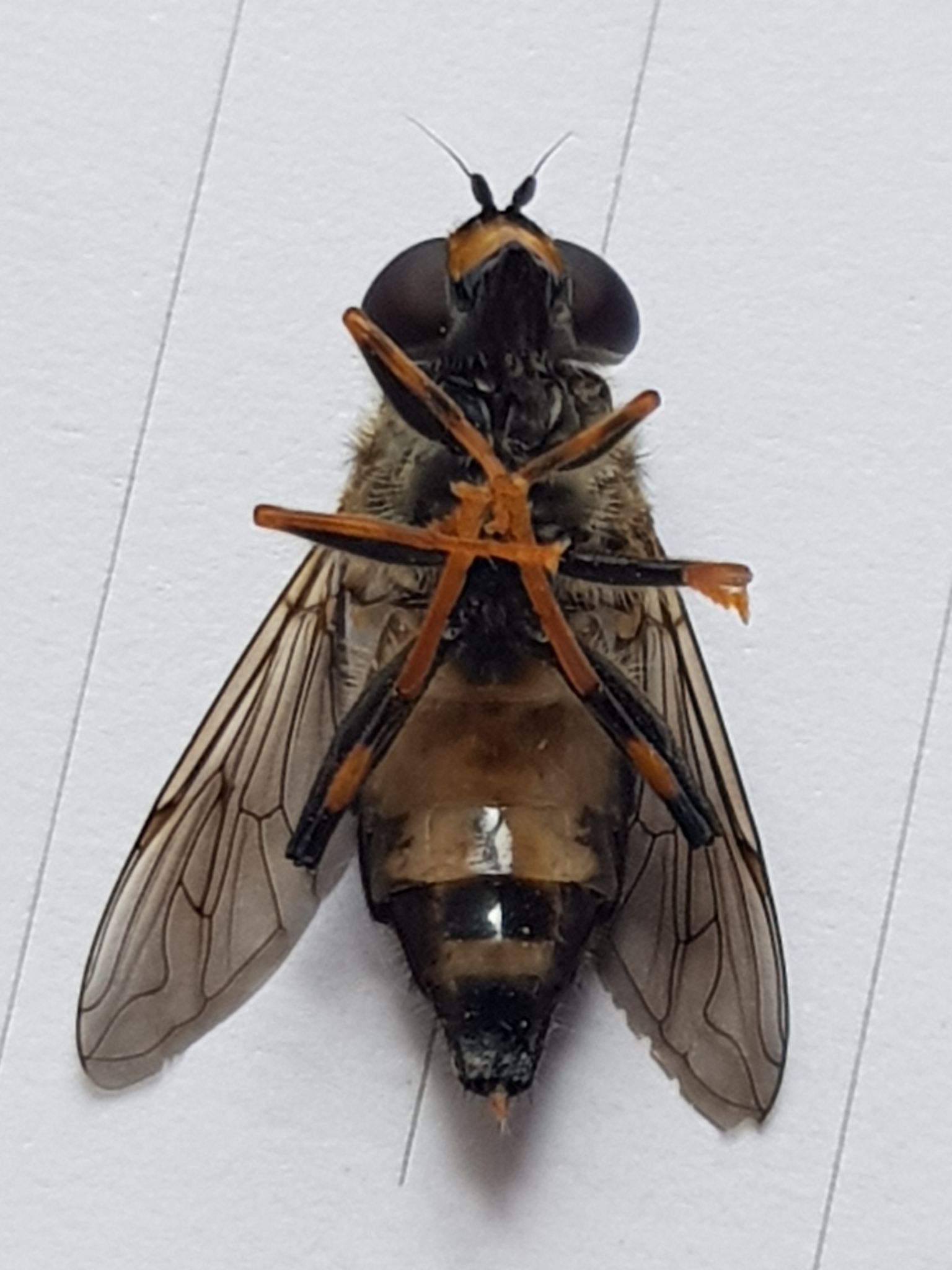
Belly of Helophilus antipodus
