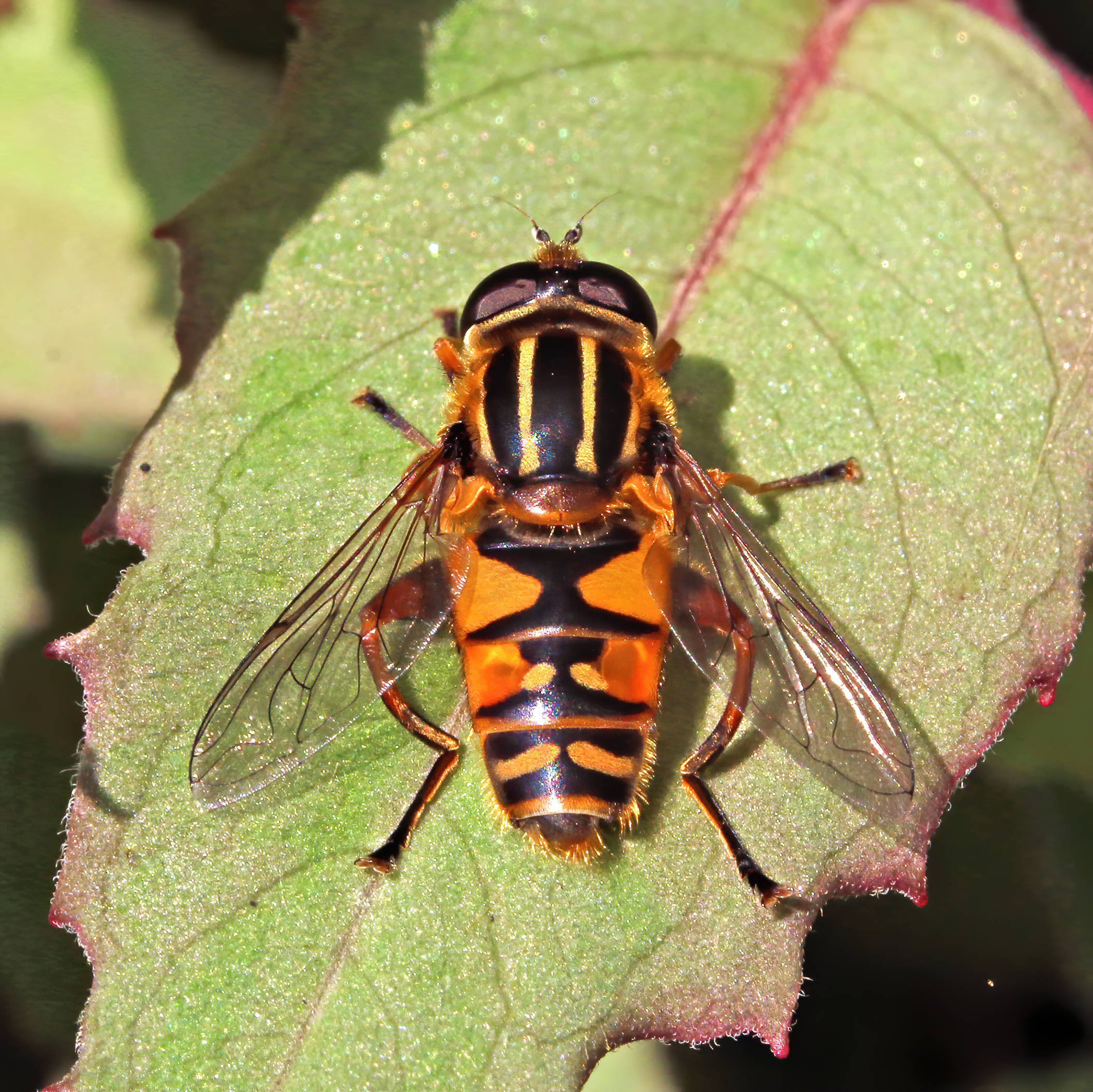
- Male, Oxfordshire
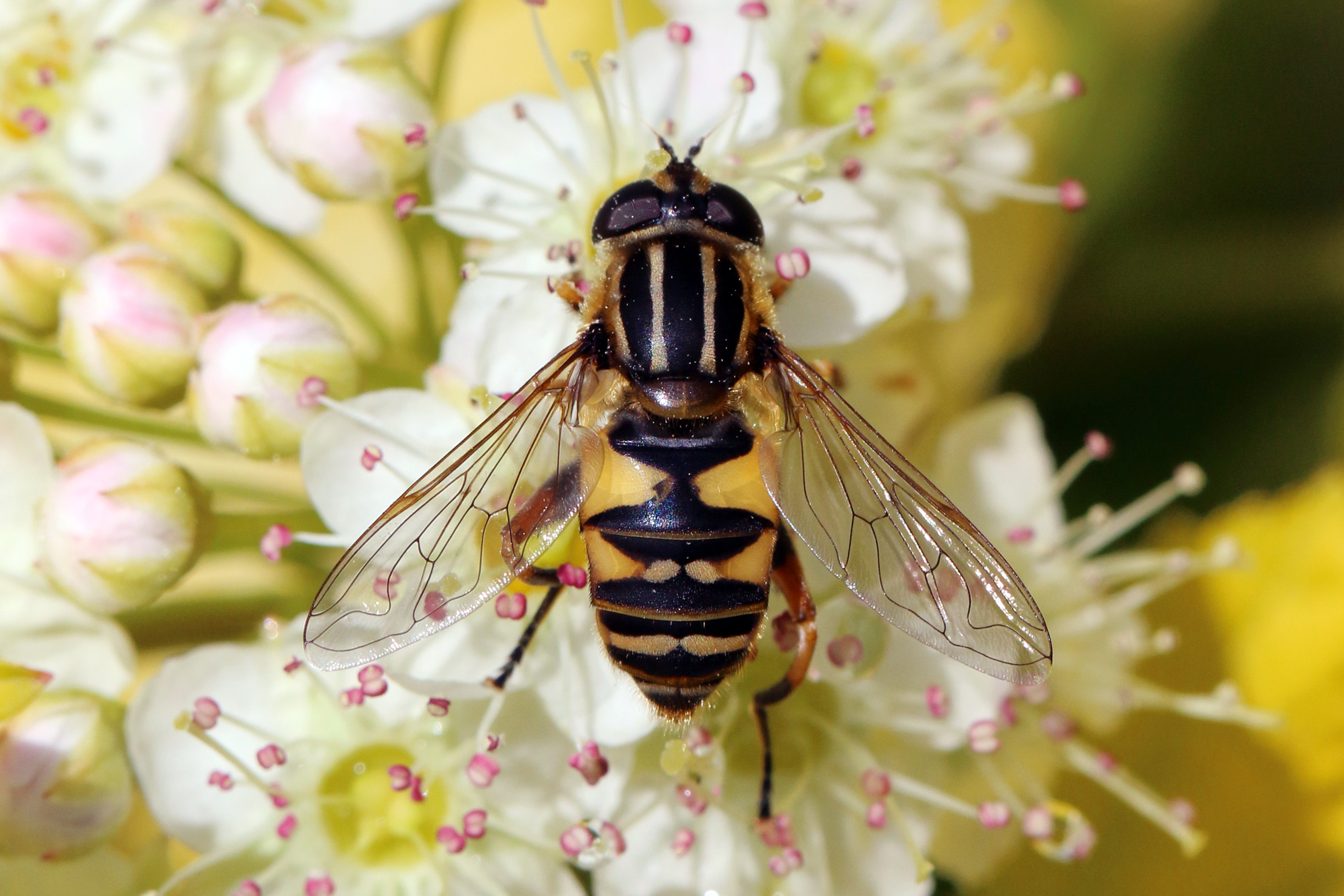
- Female, Oxfordshire

Scientific classification
- Kingdom: Animalia
- Phylum: Arthropoda
- Clade: Pancrustacea
- Class: Insecta
- Order: Diptera
- Family: Syrphidae
- Genus: Helophilus
- Species: H. pendulus

Binomial name
- Helophilus pendulus (Linnaeus, 1758)

Synonyms
- H. similis Curtis, 1832; H. trelineatus (Harris, 1782); H. trilenvus (Harris, 1776); H. trilineatus (Harris, 1776); Musca pendulus Linnaeus, 1758; Musca trelineatus Harris, 1782; Musca trilenvus Harris, 1776; Musca trilineatus Harris, 1776

= Helophilus pendulus =

Species of fly

Helophilus pendulus is a European hoverfly. Its scientific name means "Dangling marsh-lover" (from Greek helo-, "marsh", -phil, "love", Latin pend-, "hang"). It is a very common species in Britain, where it is the commonest Helophilus species. It is found throughout Europe from the Mediterranean to Scandinavia, westward to the Faroe Islands and Iceland, and through eastward through Russia from the Kola Peninsula south to Crimea and across Siberia to the Pacific Ocean.

It also has the common name sun fly, although this is probably based on a mis-reading of helo- as helio-.

== Description ==
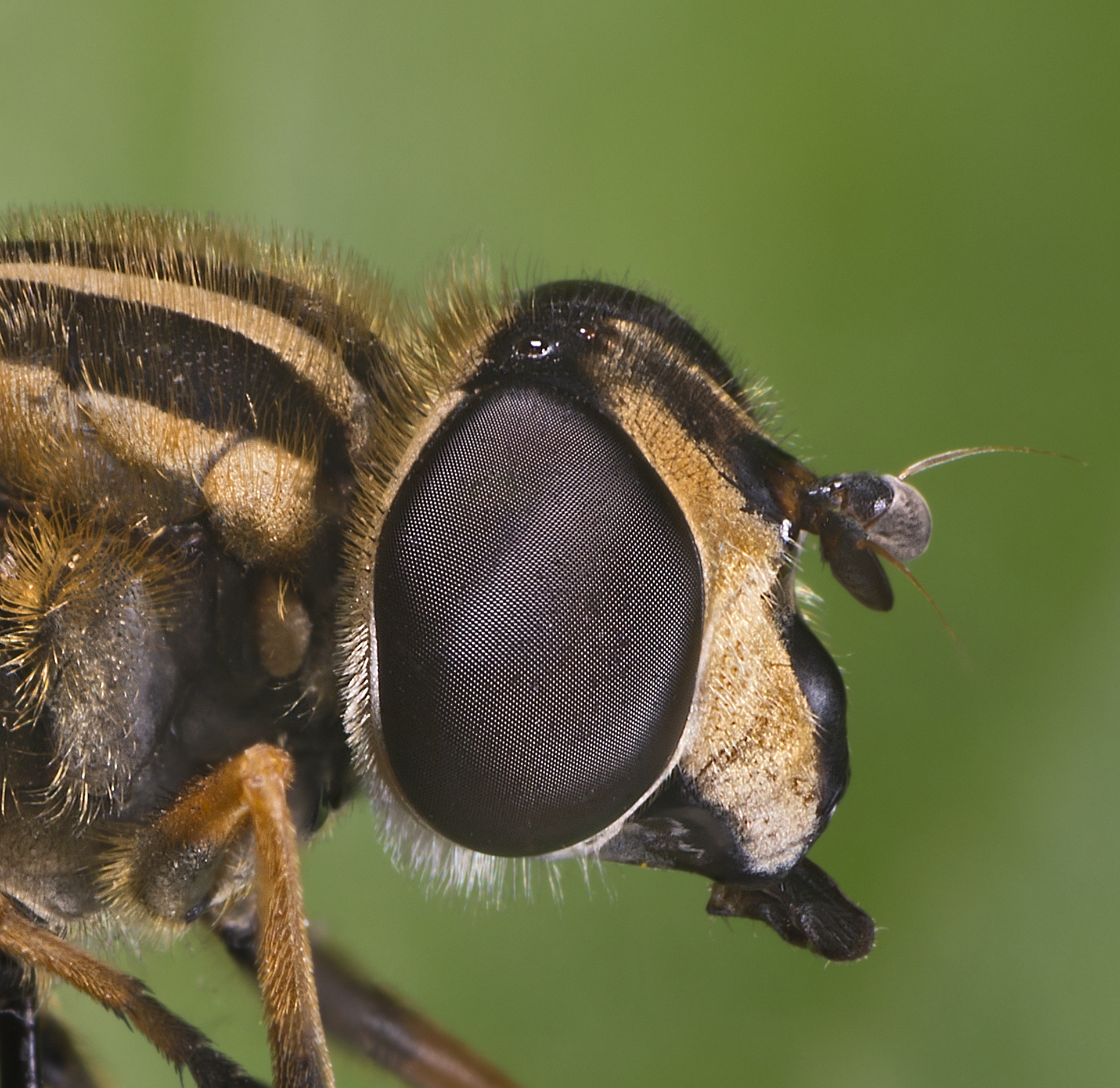
Adult portrait

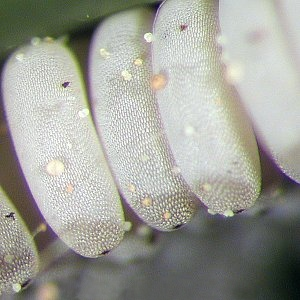
Eggs

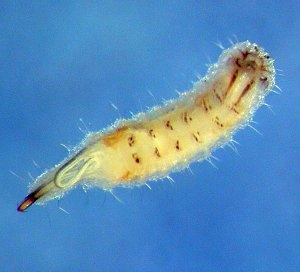
Larva

A female cleans itself (video, 40s)

=== Adults ===
Like other members of the genus Helophilus it has black and yellow longitudinal stripes on the upper surface of its thorax. The abdomen is patterned with yellow, black and grey, and for this reason it is sometimes called the footballer. It has a black central face-stripe. It has a wing-length of 8.5–11.25 mm (0.33–0.44 in).

The tergites two and three are yellow patterned with black. The black pattern consists of a band across the apex of the tergite (on its discal part only, not extending to the sides), and stripe down the centre of the tergite, and a black band across the full width of the base. Due to the black pattern described above, the main yellow areas on these tergites are at the sides of the insect but they are fairly prominent due to their large size, and their bright colour. At the basal margin of these tergites there is usually a narrow yellow border. This border is usually slightly thicker on the third tergite, where it is also more obvious as the front of tergite four is wholly black, thus enhancing the contrast of the feature. The only other Helophilus-species having this yellow border is Helophilus hybridus, but males of such species differs from pendulus-males in the black band at base of the tergite two not extending to the sides. The yellow pattern here is usually a bright, slightly orangey yellow (unlike the paler lemon yellow of trivittatus). Tergite four is largely black, with isolated dull yellow crescentic markings on each side. Females have yellow hairs on the hind part of tergite five, unlike H. hybridus females, in which these hairs are black due to certain biological adapments.

The legs possess patterning which differ from the other species in the genus. First, the hind tibia of pendulus has at least the apical half (usually all except the basal third) pale yellow, whereas other species, such as H. hybridus and H. groenlandicus have pale yellow only on the apical third or less. The middle tibia of pendulus is wholly pale, unlike H. groenlandicus, on which it has a dark apex. The mid-tarsi have extensive dark markings on at least their distal segments, unlike trivittatus which usually has wholly pale mid-tarsi.

== Ecology and behaviour ==
It is associated with a wide variety of waterbodies, from large lakes and rivers down to areas as small as ditches, small ponds and muddy puddles. Larvae have been found in cow-dung, very wet manure or very wet old sawdust.

This species visits flowers; it also commonly rests on leaves. It often emits a buzzing sound when resting. It is a notable wanderer and can be found well away from water. The larvae feed on detritus.

== Gallery ==
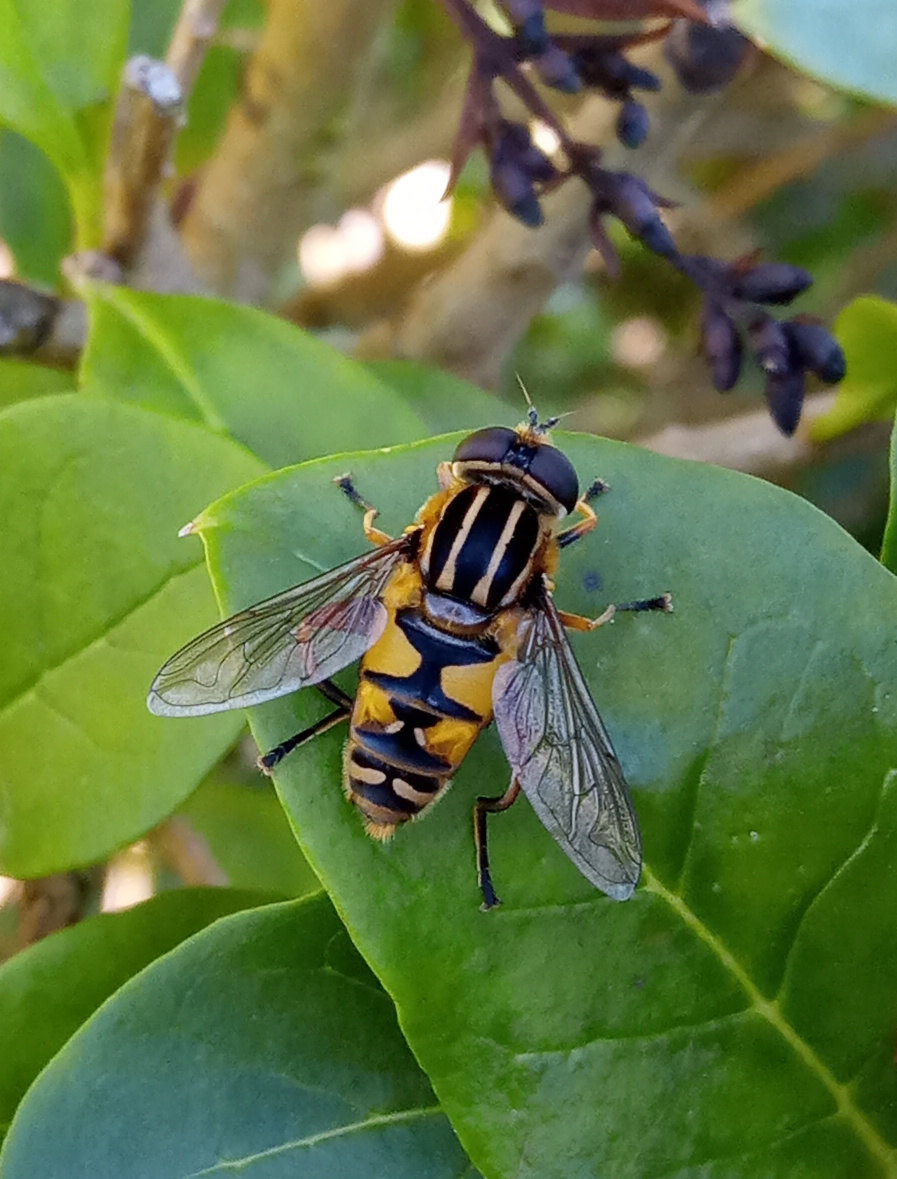
H. pendulus female rests on a leaf

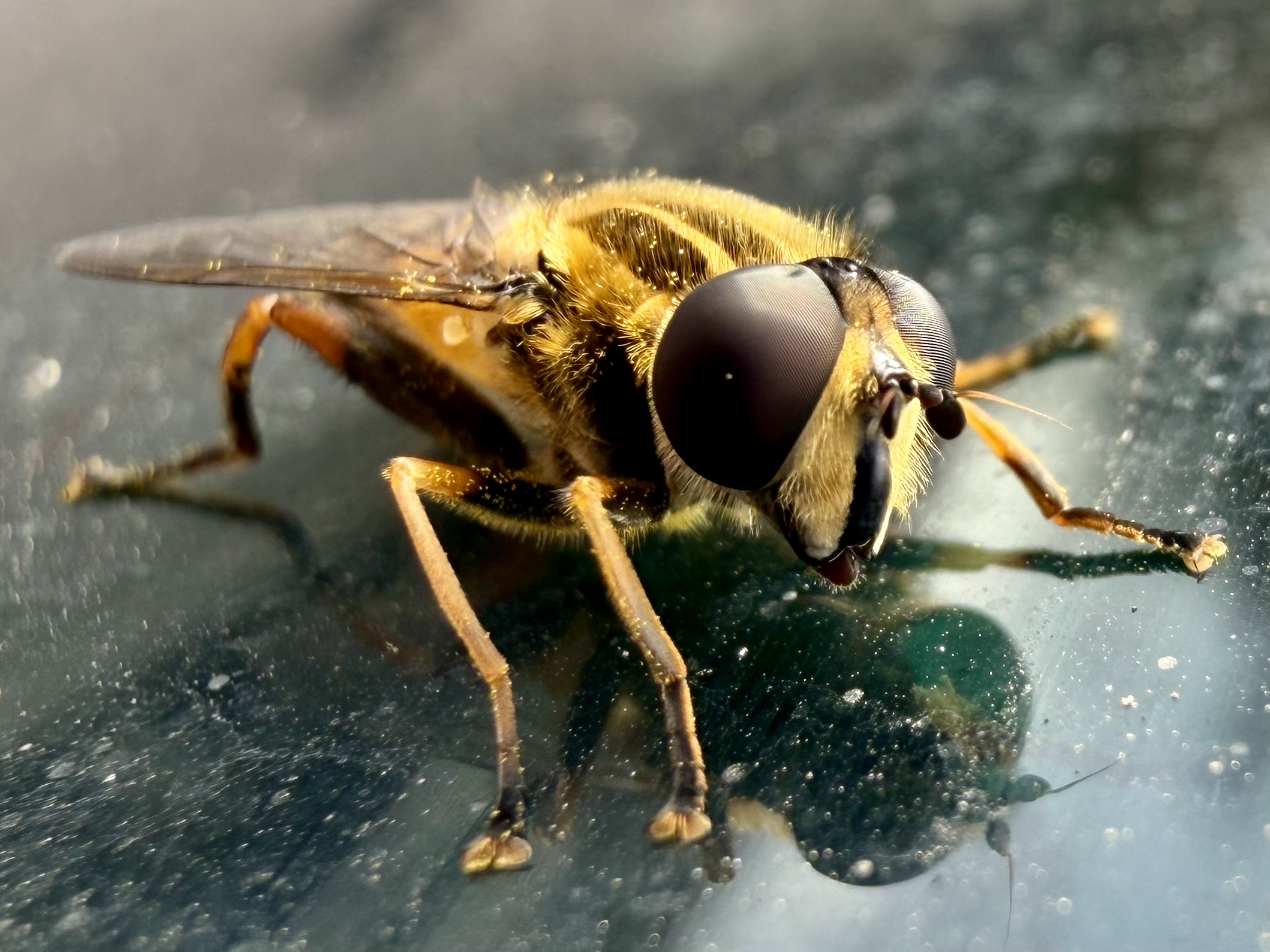
Close-up

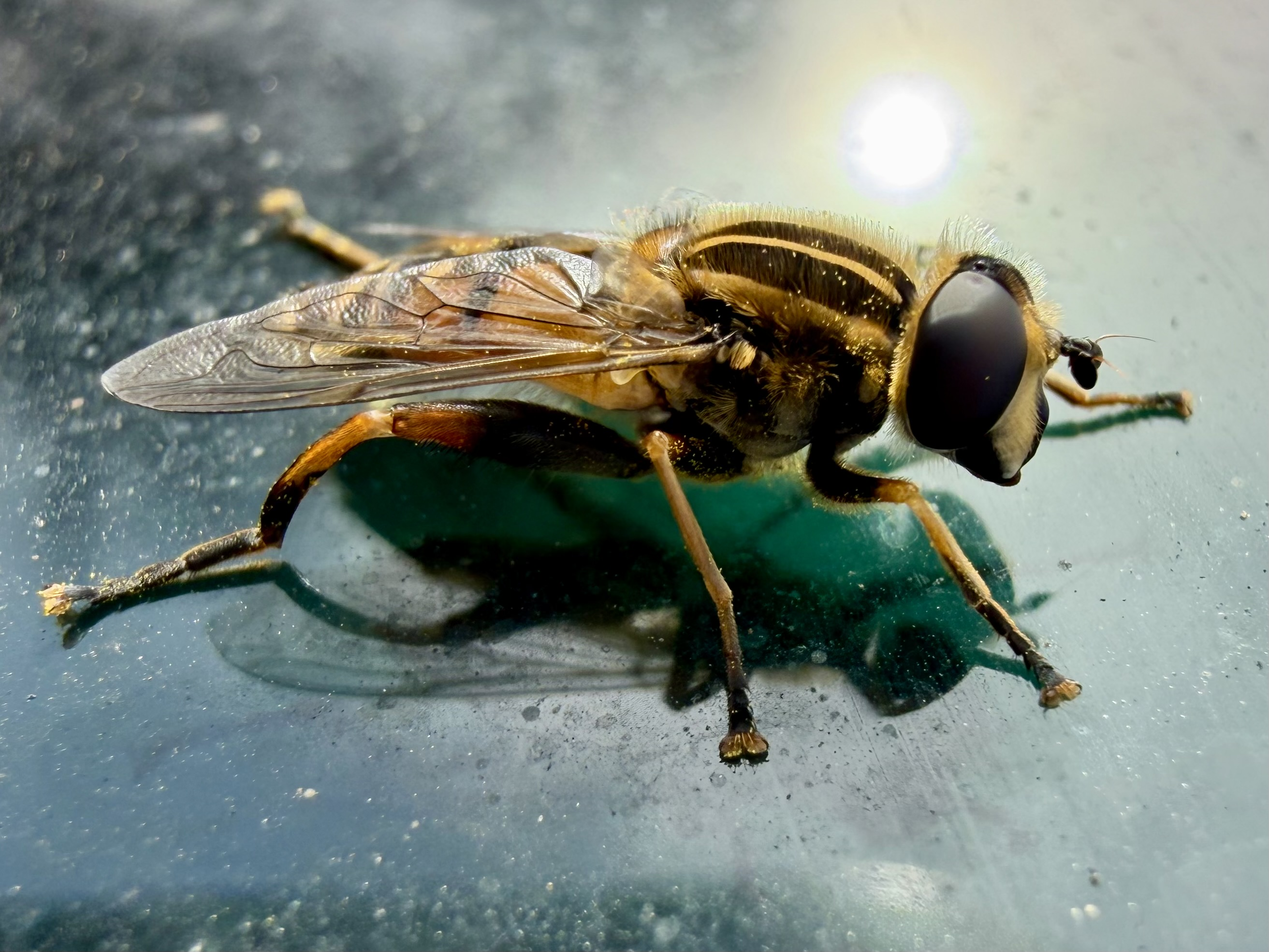
Side view
