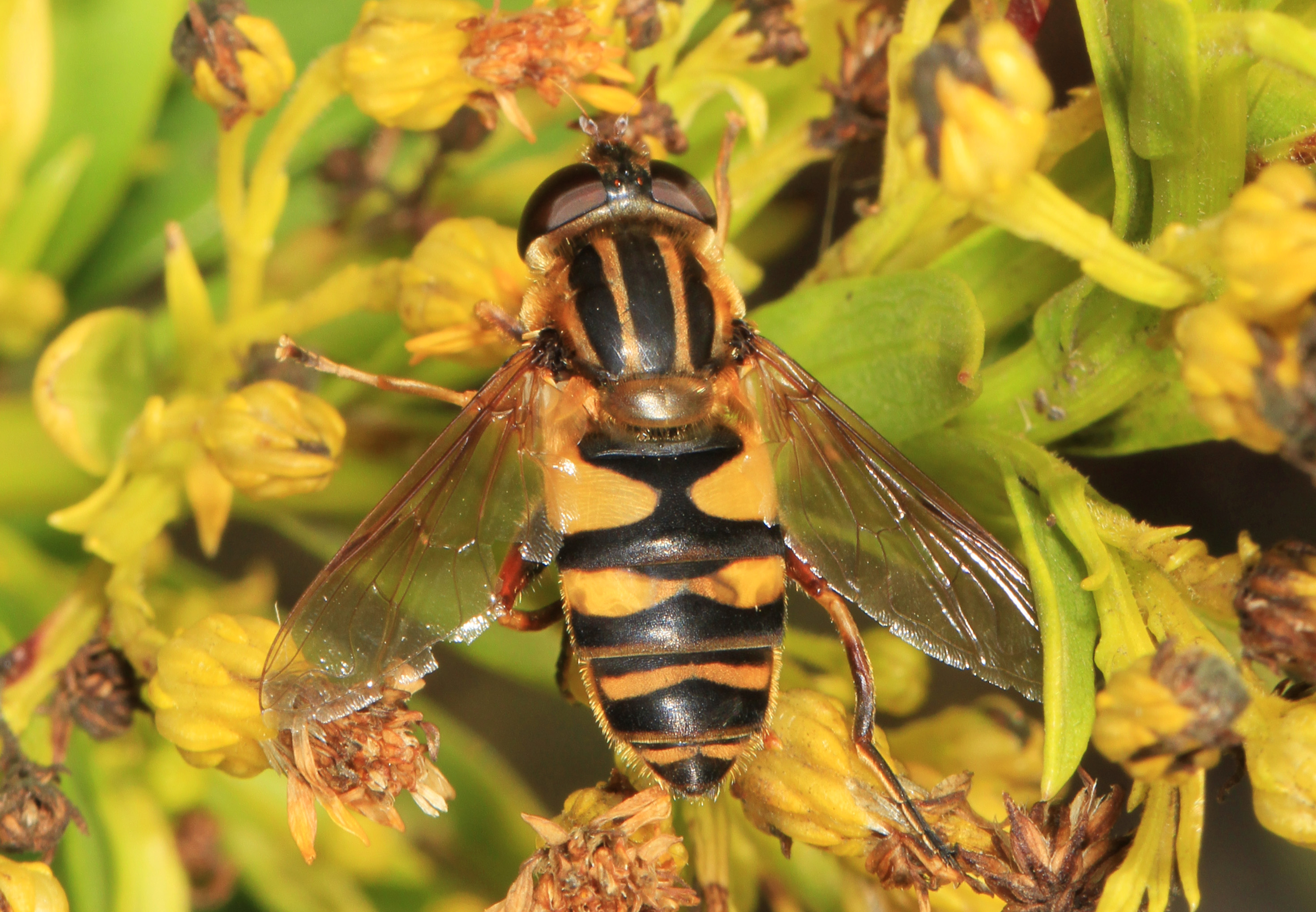

Scientific classification
- Kingdom: Animalia
- Phylum: Arthropoda
- Class: Insecta
- Order: Diptera
- Family: Syrphidae
- Genus: Helophilus
- Species: H. fasciatus

Binomial name
- Helophilus fasciatus Walker, 1849

Synonyms
- Eristalis decisus Walker, 1849; Helophilus appensus Say, 1835; Helophilus similis Macquart, 1842; Helophilus susurrans Jaennicke, 1867

= Helophilus fasciatus =

Species of insect

Helophilus fasciatus (Walker, 1849), the narrow-headed marsh fly, is an abundant species of syrphid fly observed throughout the United States and Canada. Hoverflies can remain nearly motionless in flight. The adults are also known as flower flies for they are commonly found on flowers, from which they get both energy-giving nectar and protein-rich pollen. The larvae of this genus are associated with wet decaying organic material, particularly accumulations of decaying vegetation in ponds and mud and farmyard manure or silage. The adults of this species lays eggs on vegetation overhanging the water. The larvae hatch and drop into the water.

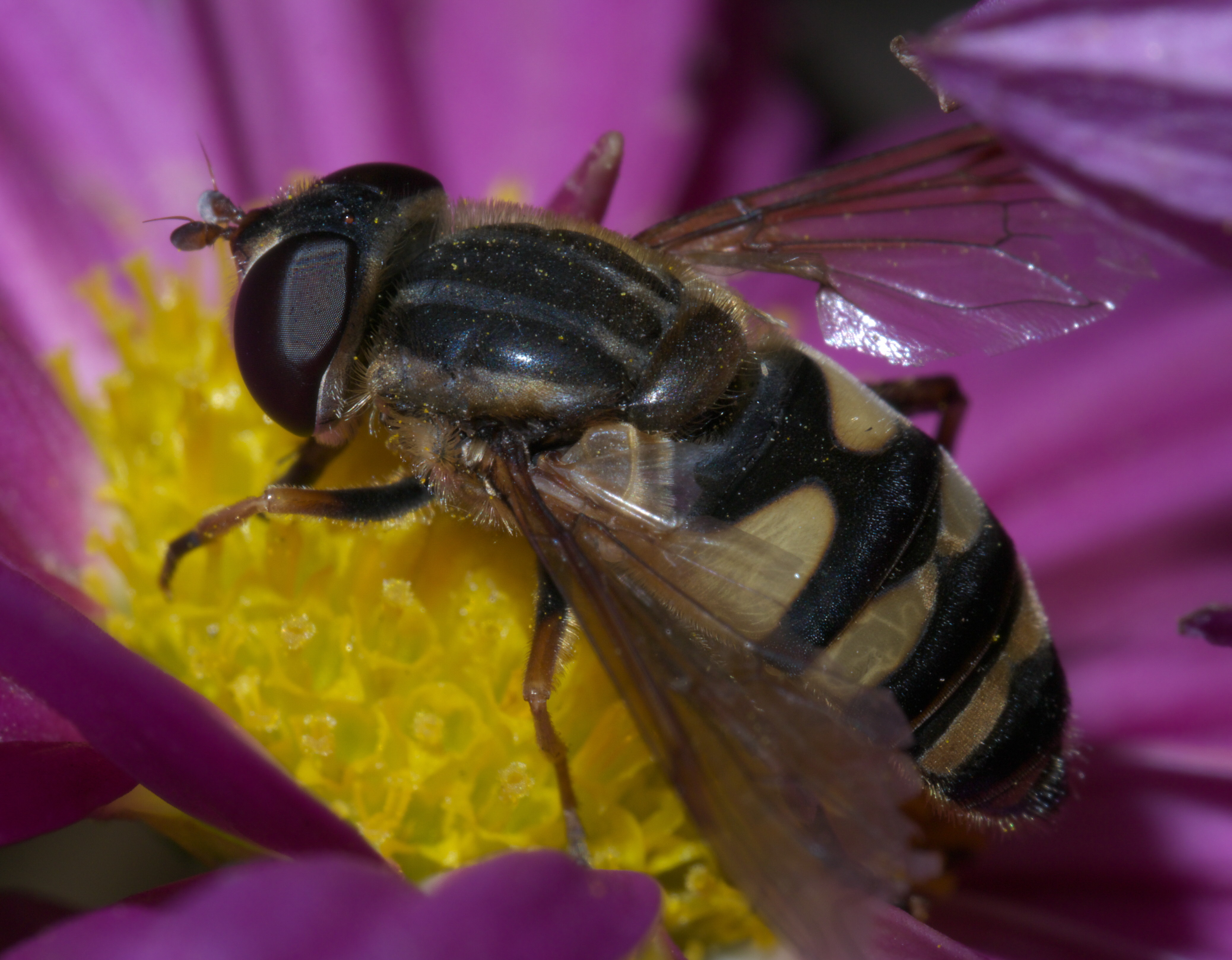

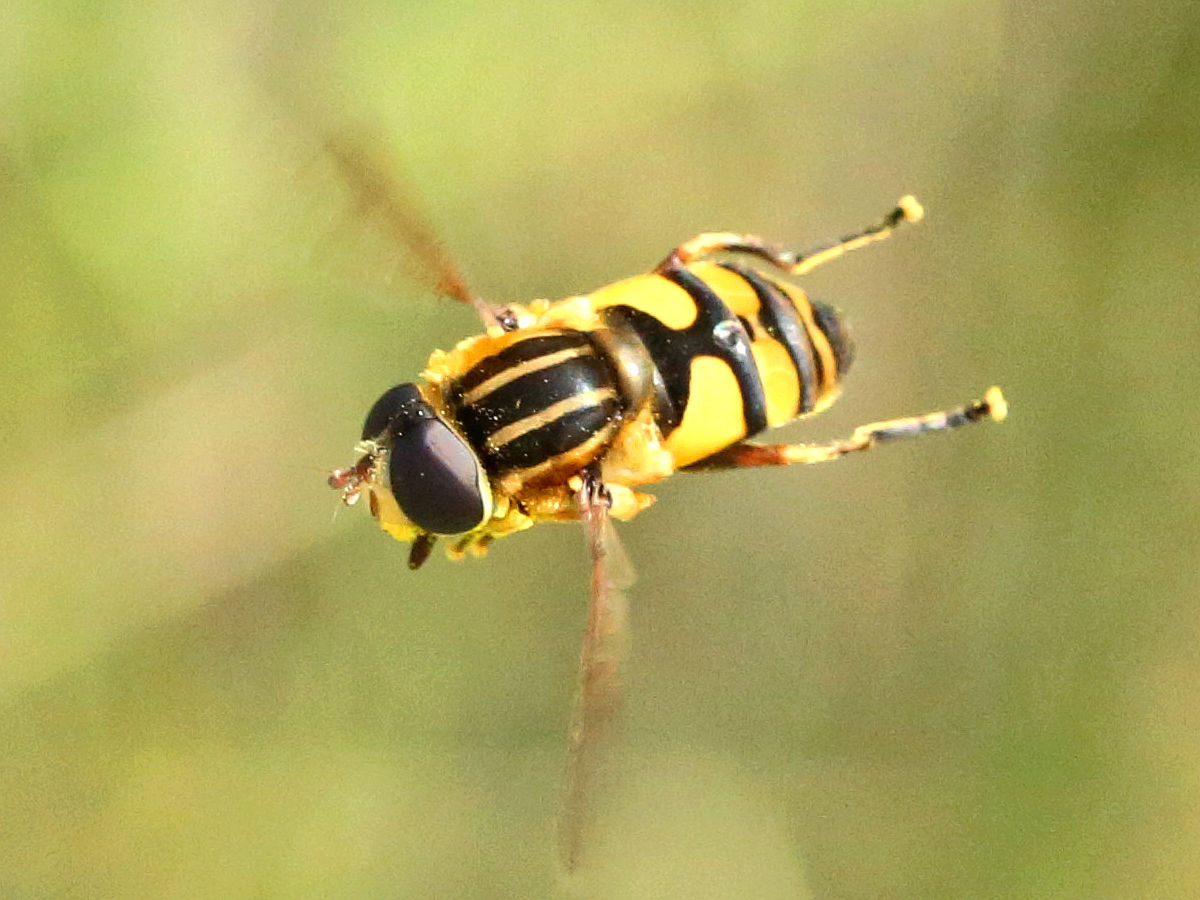
Male hovering

== Description ==
For terminology Speight key to genera and glossary

=== Size ===
Length, 13–15 mm (0.51–0.59 in)

=== Head ===
The male is dichoptic. The male's face is yellow and thickly yellow pollinose, with the middle line broadly shining reddish yellow to ferruginous but never black. The pile is pale yellowish. In profile, the face is concave on the upper three-fifths, convex below this, and the lower two-thirds convex receding, without distinct tubercle although the formation approaches one. The frons is narrowed above, and the upper portion is nearly twice as long as wide, except on the upper fifth yellow pollinose, the pollen paler on the sides before the depression and often somewhat reddish, the polished triangle chiefly blackish. The occiput is yellow to greyish pollinose and has yellow pile. The front is black pilose above suture, yellow below it and sometimes has several hairs immediately above the antennae. The antennae are reddish, sometimes more or less ferruginous, and the third joint (basobasoflagellomere) is brownish above and alically; arista is reddish. In contrast, the female's front is all black pilose, narrowed above, yellowish pollinose, and the middle line is darker and with thin brownish red or yellow pollen.

=== Thorax ===
The mesonotum is opaque or sub-opaque black in old specimens. The side margins and broadly separated sub-dorsal stripes are opaque yellow or pale greyish, and more or less narrowed towards the posterior margin, but sometimes the middle ones are a little broadened here. The pale vittae are not joined in front. The pleura are yellowish grey pollinose. The scutellum is translucent yellowish, with the very narrow base and corners black or brown. The pile of the thorax is all yellow and short, and on the disc of the scutellum, it is black.

=== Abdomen ===
The abdomen is opaque black, with large yellow spots on the second and third segments, the fourth segment faciate with pollen. The first segment is greyish pollinose except behind the corner of the scutellum, the sides broadly yellow.

In the second segment, the black forms a rather broad basal facia which is almost as long as the width of the thorax, broadly connected on the middle line with the moderately broader posterior margin. The apex is shining, and the immediate apex is narrowly reddish on the middle part. The posterior facia is of almost equal width but is slightly widened at the middle and sides but reaches or is very narrowly separated from the lateral margin.

On the third segment, the basal two-thirds are yellow with an oval black spot in the middle at the base, connected in almost its full width the black posterior border. However, in well-preserved specimens, it is more or less broadly pollinose on the connection so that the anterior spot appears isolated. The posterior margin is moderately broadly shining, and the apex is reddish, or sometimes the shining portion is all reddish. The yellow is biconvex behind so the black reaches forwards at the sides and usually touches the lateral margin.

The fourth segment has a pollinose yellow fascia which is narrower, but slightly narrowed in the middle, its outward posterior portion convex so that each side appears slightly lunulate. The pile is yellow and short, with shorter and stouter piles on each segment behind the fasciae (bands) and reaching the sides on all but the last.

In the female, the abdominal bands are narrower and the abdominal segments are shorter. The black basal fascia on the second segment extends slightly more towards the sides and is quite as wide as the thorax. The yellow spots are sharper inwardly, seldom obtuse rounded as in the male. The fascia on the third segment occupies but little over half the width of the segment.

The pollinose fascia on the fourth segment is slightly narrowed in the middle, and its outward posterior portion is convex, so that each side appears slightly lunulate. The fascia on the fifth segment reaches the base on its middle portion or is narrowly separated laterally, increasingly so towards the margin. It is slightly widened laterally, and the segmental margin is yellow as in the preceding segments. In this sex, the pollen is always yellow.

=== Wings ===
The cinereous, ashy grey coloration is interspersed with hyaline areas that are often quite yellowish anteriorly and basad of the tip of the first vein. The stigma is luteous, meaning it has a light to medium greenish tinge. The squamae are whitish, with a pale yellow border and yellow fringe, and have short pale yellowish pubescence above on the lower lobe. The halters are yellow.

=== Legs ===
The femora are black, and the apical third or less of the front four, and the apex of the hind ones, are reddish yellow. The middle tibiae are wholly yellowish or reddish, while the front ones except for the apical third, and the hind ones on the basal third or less, and the first two joints of the middle tarsi are yellowish or reddish. The legs elsewhere are black. The hind femora are moderately broadened, widest at the apical third, and below with dense black short, coarse hairs, while the pile elsewhere is all yellow.
