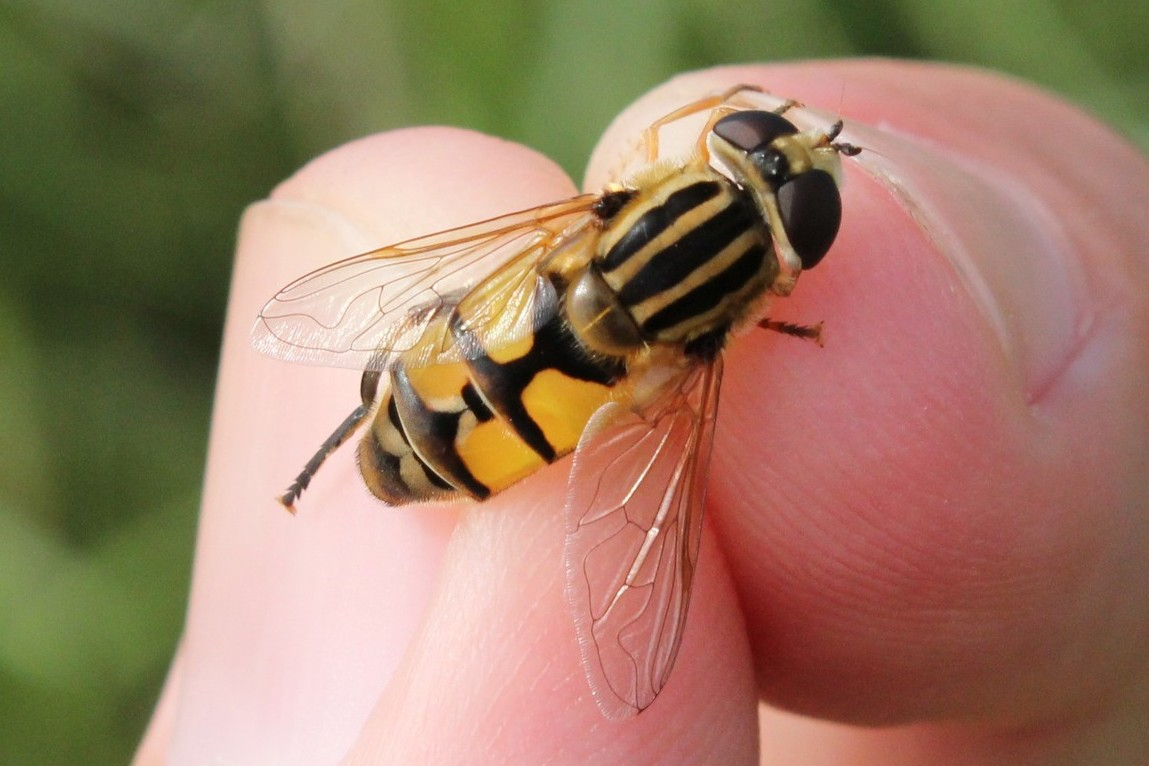

Scientific classification
- Kingdom: Animalia
- Phylum: Arthropoda
- Class: Insecta
- Order: Diptera
- Family: Syrphidae
- Genus: Helophilus
- Species: H. latifrons

Binomial name
- Helophilus latifrons Loew, 1863

= Helophilus latifrons =

Species of fly

Helophilus latifrons (Loew, 1863), the Broad-headed Marsh Fly, is a species of syrphid fly observed throughout the United States, in lower Canada and the mountains on Mexico. Hoverflies can remain nearly motionless in flight. The adults are also known as flower flies for they are commonly found on flowers from which they get both energy-giving nectar and protein rich pollen. The larvae are aquatic feeding on decaying vegetation.
