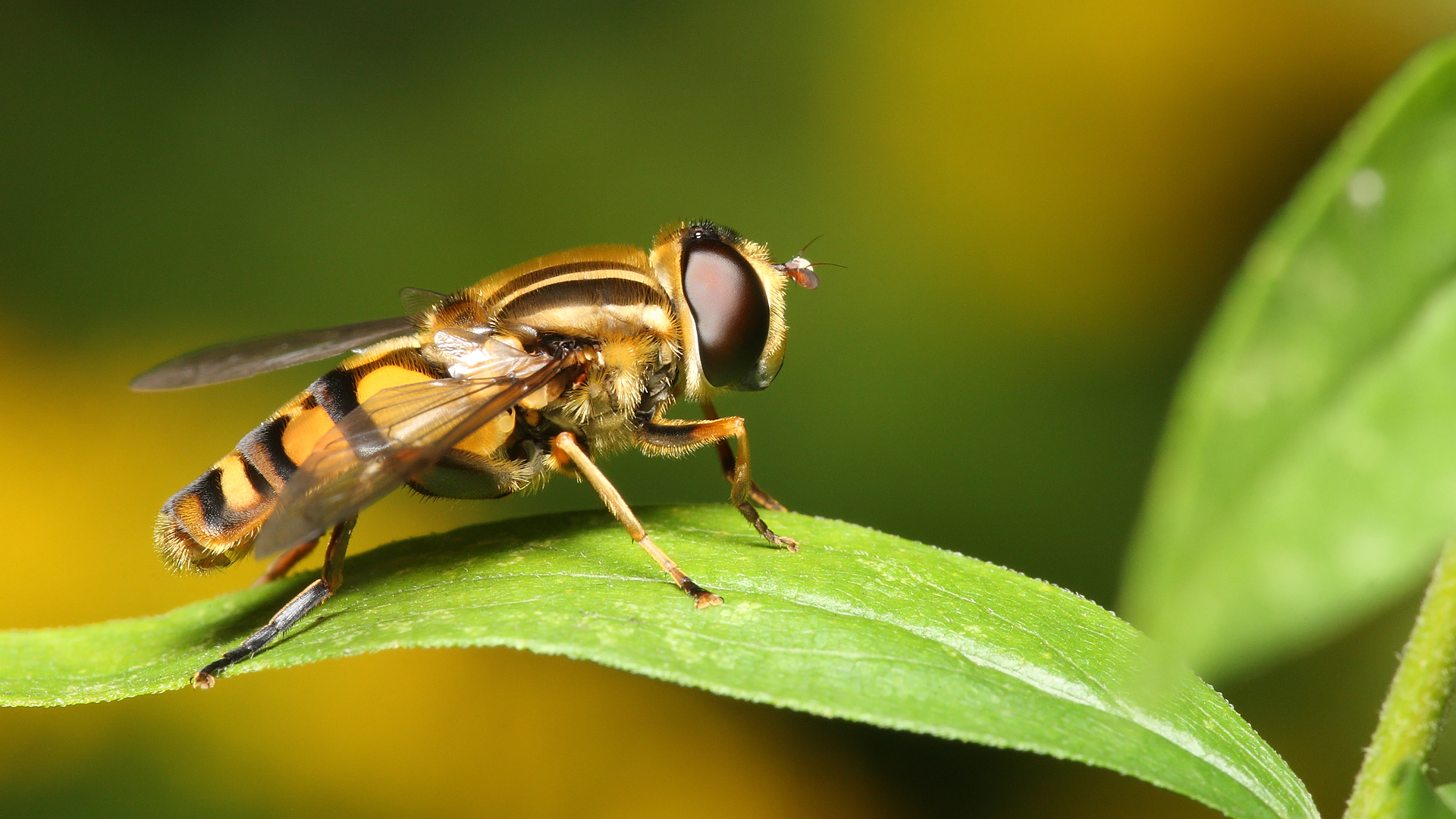

Scientific classification
- Domain: Eukaryota
- Kingdom: Animalia
- Phylum: Arthropoda
- Class: Insecta
- Order: Diptera
- Family: Syrphidae
- Genus: Helophilus
- Species: H. intentus

Binomial name
- Helophilus intentus Curran & Fluke, 1922

= Helophilus intentus =

Species of fly

Helophilus intentus is a species of syrphid fly in the family Syrphidae.
