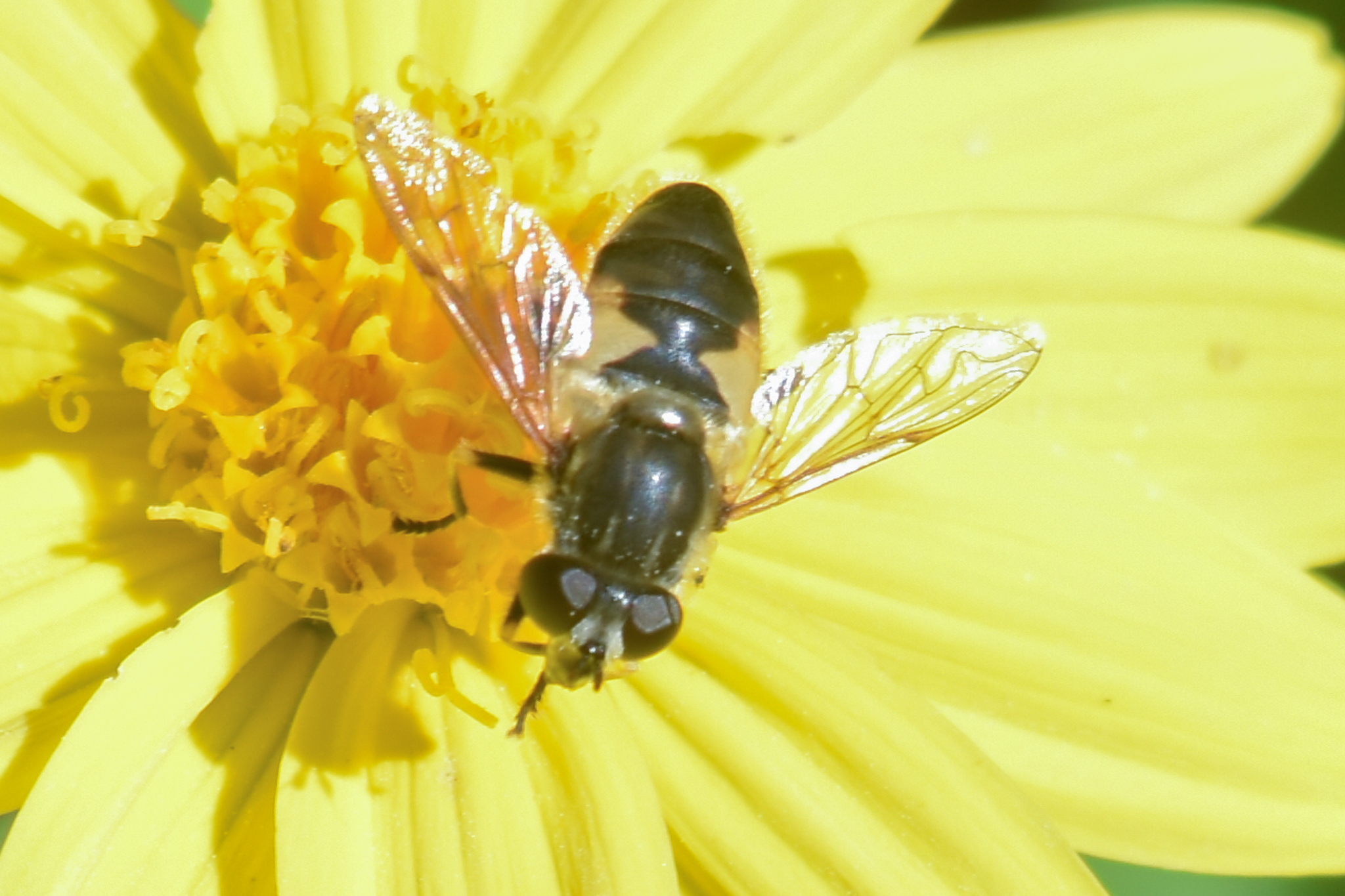
- H. lapponicus

Scientific classification
- Kingdom: Animalia
- Phylum: Arthropoda
- Clade: Pancrustacea
- Class: Insecta
- Order: Diptera
- Family: Syrphidae
- Genus: Helophilus
- Species: H. lapponicus

Binomial name
- Helophilus lapponicus Wahlberg, 1844

Synonyms
- Eristalis androclus Walker, 1849; Eristalis chalepus Walker, 1852; Eristalis frater Walker, 1849; Helophilus borealis Staeger, 1845; Helophilus bruesi Graenicher, 1910; Helophilus dychei Williston, 1897; Helophilus glacialis Loew, 1846

= Helophilus lapponicus =

Species of fly

Helophilus lapponicus, the Yellow-margined Marsh Fly, is a common species of syrphid fly observed across northern North America, northern Europe, Greenland and Siberia. Hoverflies can remain nearly motionless in flight. The adults are also known as flower flies for they are commonly found on flowers, from which they get both energy-giving nectar and protein-rich pollen. Though common the larvae of this species are not known but the larvae of other species in this genus are associated with wet decaying organic material, particularly accumulations of decaying vegetation in ponds and mud and are a so called rat-tailed type.

== Description ==
For terminology Speight key to genera and glossary

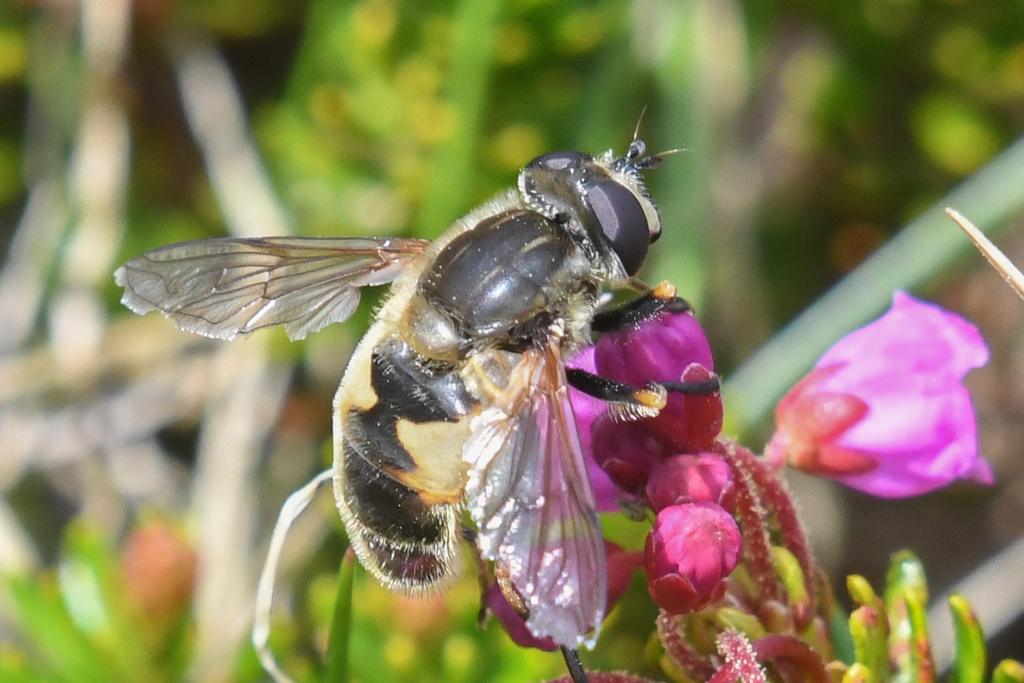
H. lapponicus

=== Size ===
12.5–13.5 mm (0.49–0.53 in)

=== Head ===
The face is deeply concave below the antennae, with a strongly produced tubercle that is large and recedes in profile. The lower border of the face forms an obtuse angle with the posterior border of the head. In the middle of the face is a broad, shining grey dusted black stripe that reaches to the base of the antenna. The face is covered with whitish-yellow or grayish-yellow pollen, except for the gena which are shining black. The pile of the frons is black, and on the vertex it is yellowish in moderate extent. In males, there is a middle stripe with a narrow oral margin and shining black cheeks. The rest of the face is yellowish-red and densely yellow pollinose, with the pile pallidly yellowish. In profile, the face is moderately concave on the upper two-fifths, with a lower portion that is slightly receding and a little convex. Two fifths of the face lie below the border of the eye. The males eyes are separated. The front of the face has parallel sides above the depression, with the upper portion longer than wide, and before the suture it is whitish-yellow with pollen, becoming yellow or even brownish-yellow on the upper portion, and brownish-yellow on the upper part. There is a broad shining black arch immediately above the antennae, and the pile is yellow on the lower portion, on the lower part of the upper portion, and at the vertex, and black elsewhere. The vertex is blackish, with the middle line of the frons sometimes dark. The occiput is greyish-yellow pollinose, with yellowish pile that becomes almost whitish below. The antennae are black with a shining black spot immediately above their base. The third joint (flagellum) is velvety brown and irregularly circular, slightly broader than long. The arista is twice the length of the antennae and is tapering and ferruginous.

=== Thorax ===
The thorax is opaque black with grayish-white light stripes. The front half of the lateral stripes and the posterior part of the middle stripes are indistinct. The dorsum pile is entirely yellow. The scutellum is yellowish-brownish and shining, and it is wholly yellowish pilose. The mesonotum is rather dull blackish, with the sides being either aeneous or thinly greyish pollinose. It has a pair of broadly separated and almost whitish, slender stripes that are widest anteriorly and often scarcely evident on the posterior half. In some specimens, these stripes are practically absent, while in others, they reach the scutellum and slightly broaden behind. The pleura is thinly greyish pollinose. The narrow base of the scutellum is blackish, while the rest of it is yellow. The thorax is wholly greyish yellow pilose, with some black pile in front of the scutellum. The scutellum is yellow pilose.

=== Abdomen ===
The abdomen is black and wholly shining on the dorsum. The pile on each segment in front is whitish and behind the bands, blackish. On the lateral margins of each segment, the whitish-yellow pile reaches farther back, so that on the posterior angles only a trace of the blackish pile remains. The abdomen is over half-shining greenish-black, with the second segment except the apex, basal half of the third and a small basal spot in the middle of the fourth, more or less opaque, scarcely so in some specimens. The second and third segments have yellow spots, and the third and fourth each have a pair of greyish pollinose, transverse spots. The paragraph describes the physical characteristics of various segments of an insect's body, primarily the second, third, and fourth segments of the abdomen. The sides of the second segment are yellow and expand to form a large triangle, which is broadly separated in the middle, slightly concave in front, and slightly convex behind. On the second segment on each side, there is a large yellow spot, usually three-cornered, of which the point that is directed inward is usually somewhat whitish colored, and is narrowly separated from the opposite one. The third segment has a small orange spot on the anterior angles, with a slight oblique on each side of the middle line and an elongate oval greyish pollinose spot, the inner ends of which are moderately separated.On the third segment on each side, there is a narrow whitish arcuate band, which starts from a small yellow spot on the anterior angle of the segment The fourth segment has a pair of similar spots, which are less widely separated, a little more oblique, and slightly narrower.On the fourth segment, there is the same whitish semi-fascia, but no indication of the yellow spot. On the last segment, the bands are also present, but they are somewhat shorter and less distinct. The venter is shining black and beset with sparse, obscure whitish pile. The abdominal pile is pale, except for a small apical black pilose triangle on the fourth segment's apex, which may be enlarged, in which case the third segment bears a triangle. The genitalia are pale behind.

In females, the second segment has a narrow apical facia of black pile on the median half, the third has a wider one broadly separated from the lateral margins. The fourth segment has an incomplete black aired fascia that is angularly produced forward in the middle, and the fifth has a large apical triangle of black pile, almost reaching the base. The paragraph also mentions the black on the posterior margin of the spot, which usually extends over halfway from the middle line to the side margin, sometimes two-thirds the distance.

=== Wings ===
The wings are almost hyaline, very grayish-brownish with a yellow stigma with a yellowish pubescence and a white fringe. The halters are also yellow. The vein R_{4+5} is strongly bent.

=== Legs ===
The legs are black, with the apices of the femora being yellow. The hind pair of femora are moderately broad while the tip of all femora are yellow. The tibiae are black with the basal third of the hind pair, and a little more than a third of the front and middle pairs, being yellow. The hind pair of tibiae is moderately bent and not thickened at the end. The tarsi are black throughout. Additionally, the pile on the femora are black with yellow behind the front four and on the dorsal surface of hind ones. The pile on the tibiae is mostly yellow on the front four, with only the front side of hind ones being of this color and the rest being black.
