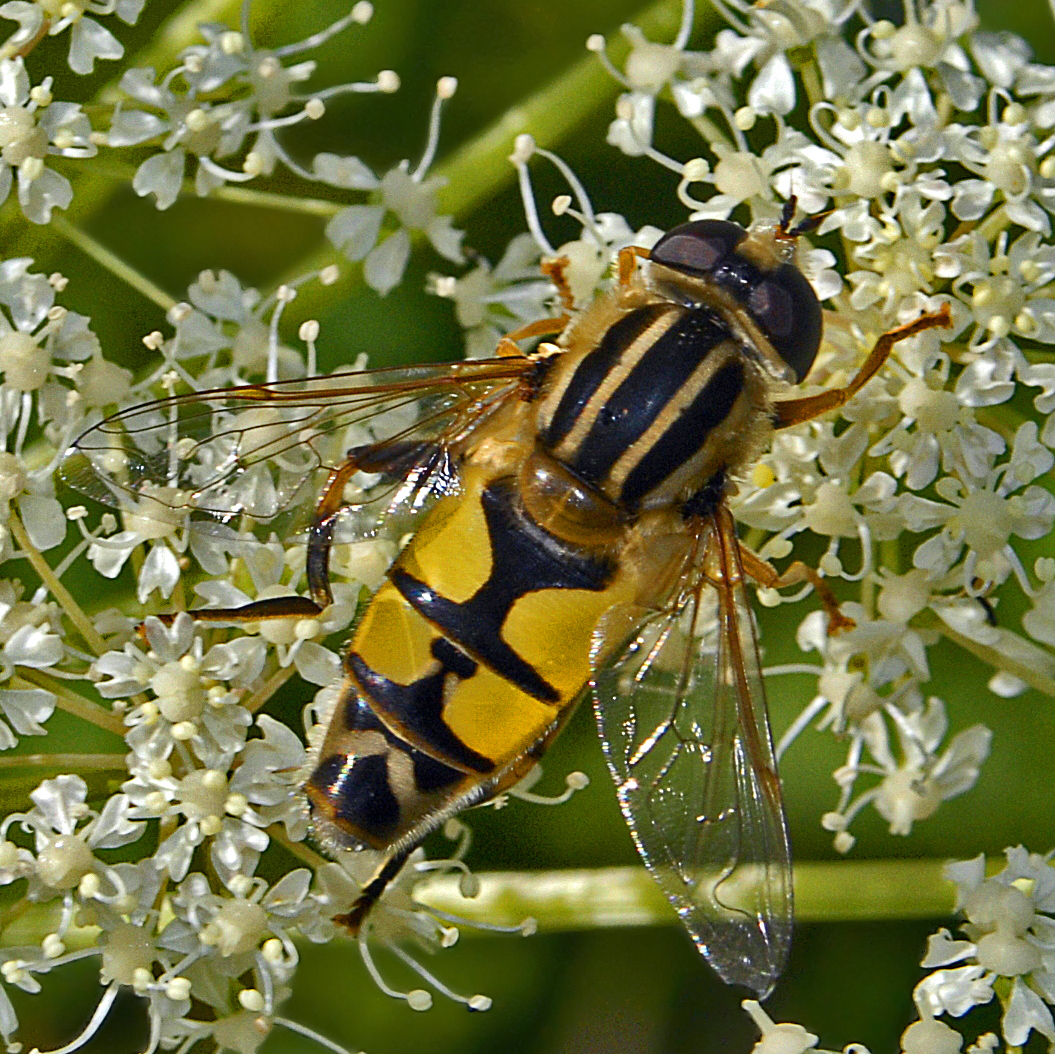
- Male

Scientific classification
- Kingdom: Animalia
- Phylum: Arthropoda
- Class: Insecta
- Order: Diptera
- Family: Syrphidae
- Genus: Helophilus
- Species: H. trivittatus

Binomial name
- Helophilus trivittatus (Fabricius, 1805)

Synonyms
- Helophilus parallelus (Harris, 1776); Helophilus parrallelus (Harris, 1780); Musca parallelus Harris, 1776; Musca parrallelus Harris, 1780

= Helophilus trivittatus =

Species of fly

Helophilus trivittatus is a species of Palearctic hoverfly.

== Etymology ==
The scientific genus name is composed of the parts helos (ἕλος, gr.), meaning "marsh" and philos (φίλος, gr.) meaning "friend". The species name is composed by "tri" (lat.), meaning "three" and "vitta" (lat.) meaning "band". This name refer to the preference of these insects for moist areas and to the fact that they carry three stripes on the breast shield.

== Description ==
For terms see Morphology of Diptera

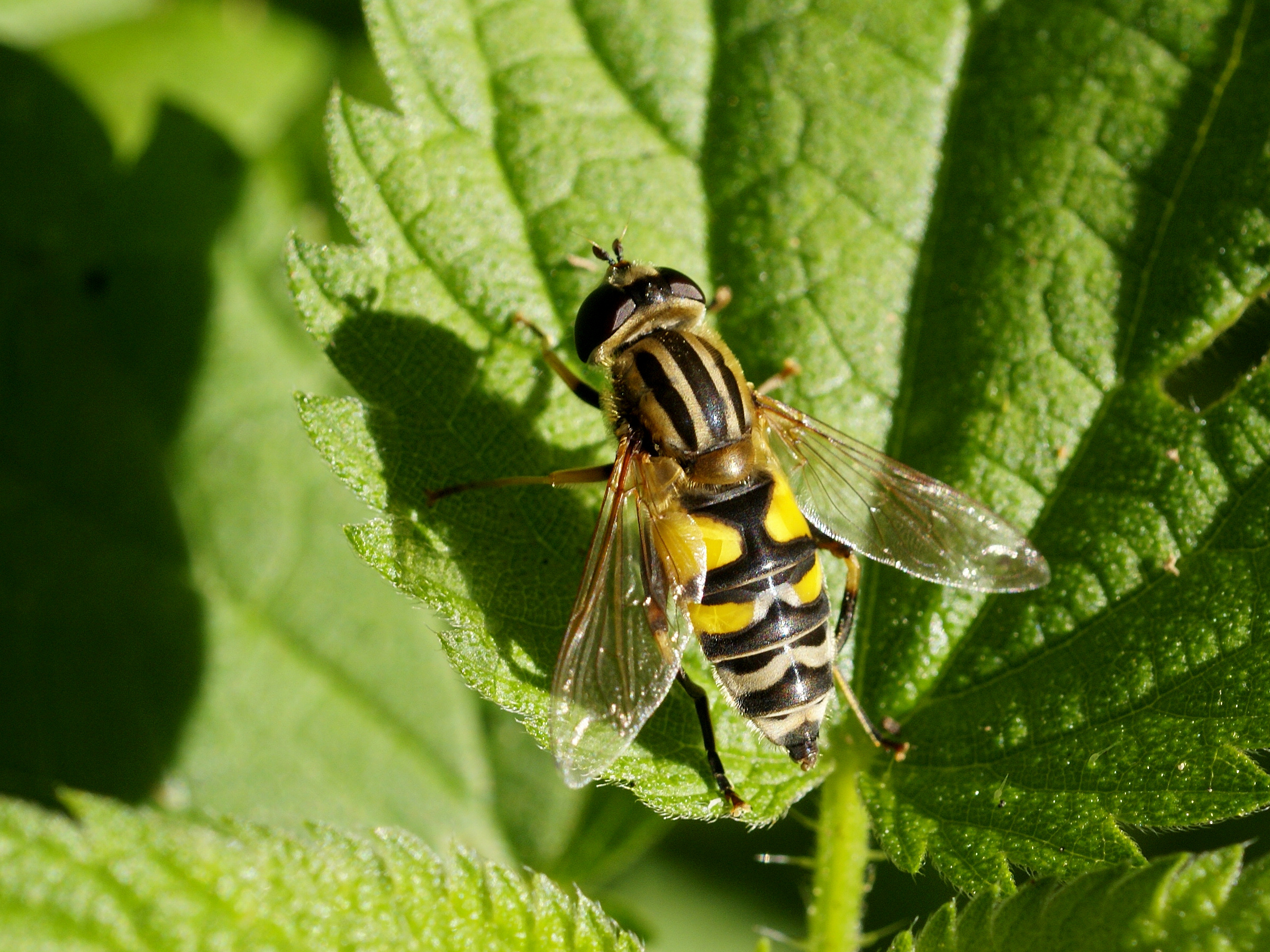
Female

Male on flower (video, 40s)

Helophilus trivittatus has a wing length of 10.25–12.25 millimetres (0.404–0.482 in). The eyes are separated in both sexes, in the male a little less than in the female. The antennae are black, Face shows a wide yellow longitudinal stripe, with at most a central reddish-brown stripe. On the thorax four narrow pale yellow stripes alternate with three larger dark brown stripes. The drawing of the flattened abdomen is reminiscent of a wasp.

The drawing of the third and fourth segments of the abdomen is different in the two sexes. In the male, only the third segment carries a pale yellow to gray arc line. In the female, such a curve is found on the fourth and the fifth tergite. Tergites 2 and 3 have pale lemon yellow spots, while tergite 4 has white to grey spots. In the females tergite 3 yellow spots touch the front margin. The larva is illustrated by Hartley (1961)

See references for determination.

== Distribution ==
This species is present in most of Europe and in the eastern Palearctic realm. It is widespread from Fennoscandia south to the Mediterranean Basin, and from Ireland east through Europe, Siberia, and the Russian Far East to the Pacific. it is also present in Iran and Afghanistan. It has been observed migrating in Sweden.

== Habitat ==
These hoverflies inhabit wetland, river margins, seasonally flooded grassland and salt-marsh. They are anthropophilic in southern Europe, where it frequents irrigation ditches in farmland.

== Biology ==
The flight period of this species is from May to October. Adults feed on various flowers, including umbellifers, yellow composites, Armeria, Aster, Cakile, Centaurea, Chrysanthemum, Cirsium, Crataegus, Chamaenerion angustifolium, Eryngium, Eupatorium, Euphorbia, Ligustrum, Lychnis, Lythrum, Mentha, Menyanthes, Origanum, Plumbago, Polygonum persicaria, Potentilla, Ranunculus, Rubus fruticosus, Salix and Sorbus. The larva is a detritivore associated with decaying rhizomes of Typha latifolia and with beds of Glyceria maxima.
