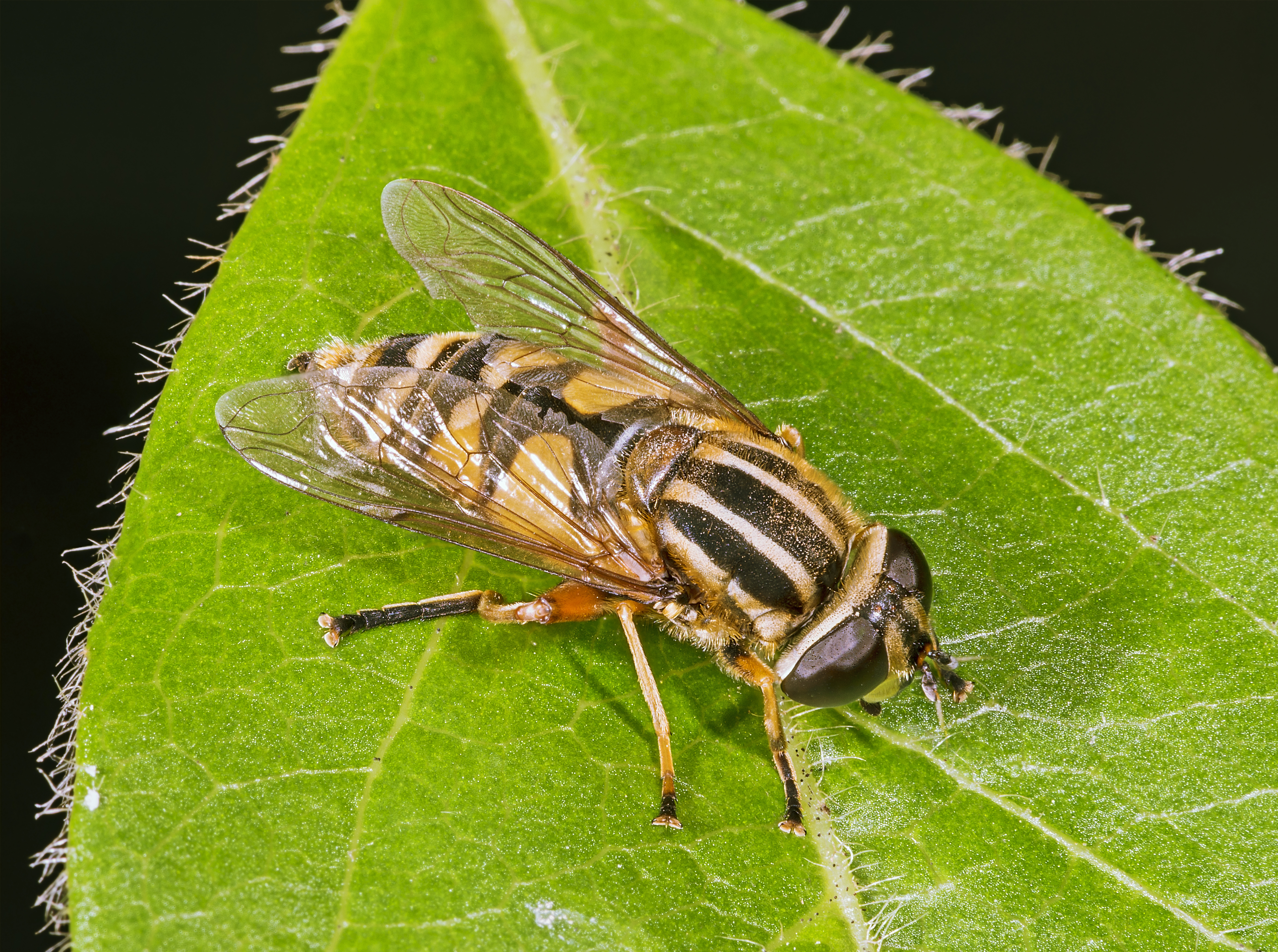
- Helophilus pendulus

Scientific classification
- Kingdom: Animalia
- Phylum: Arthropoda
- Clade: Pancrustacea
- Class: Insecta
- Order: Diptera
- Family: Syrphidae
- Subfamily: Eristalinae
- Tribe: Eristalini
- Subtribe: Helophilina
- Genus: Helophilus; Meigen, 1822

= Helophilus =

Genus of flies

Helophilus are a diverse genus of moderate to large hoverflies, that appear somewhat bee-like. This genus comprises two subgenera: Helophilus and Pilinasica. Larvae filter-feed in organic rich water. All Helophilus adults have a distinctive lengthwise striped thorax and a transverse striped abdomen.

== Description ==
The species in genus Helophilus are large yellow-black hoverflies ranging in length from 9 to 16.5 mm. They are very fast flies with big eyes. Most of these flies have yellow stripes on their scutum, large yellow-orange markings on their abdomen, and an elongate pterostigma on the wing. Some special species are blue metallic (Helophilus hochstetteri) or black and white (Helophilus cingulatus). The adults often resemble bees.

== Ecology ==
Diet

Adults feed on pollen and nectar. They get protein from the pollen and energy from the nectar. Females often need to eat pollen before their eggs will develop. Larvae feed on the micro-organisms responsible for the decay in ponds and ditches.

Foraging behavior

The flight period of Helophilus is mostly summer. In Europe, flight periods commence as early as March and conclude as late as October. Helophilus rarely hovered, seeming to fly without hesitation from one flower to another. When Helophilus was alarmed, they will change their flight to zig-zag flight which makes them look like bees. They make large amplitude dorsoventral movements of their abdomen while they are foraging on flowers.

Pollination

Most species are not specialized. Some species have flower color requirements, such as Helophilus pendulus, which tends to prefer white and yellow flowers.

Adults feed on pollen and nectar in flowers. They have more pollen-gathering hairs on the body so that pollen is collected while they sip nectar. This pollen is then groomed from the body by the legs and transferred to the mouth. This genus is certainly a pollinator. They are not restricted to a limited home range and may carry pollen over longer distances than bees while foraging, and over considerably longer distances during migration. Migratory species may also be present in very high densities, which may make up for potentially lower pollinator efficiency. Migratory pollinators may be particularly important for geographically isolated plant populations.

Some species of genus Helophilus such as H. groenlandicus can lead to some self-pollination in P. laurentiana.

Migration

There is a few species that migrate, such as H. trivittatus and H. affinis. The migrated species are capable of crossing considerable stretches of ocean.

== Lifecycle ==
The adults are short-lived and survive for a few days to a few weeks. The adults lay their eggs in water rich in nutrients and organic matter. The eggs hatch after a short period which is highly dependent upon temperature. The larvae live in the mud at the bottom and have organs at the end of their bodies to help them breathe. The posterior end of the body is highly elongated into a telescopic siphon, which is extended to the surface and adjusted in length according to the depth of the water or mud. The larvae are called rat-tailed maggots. The larvae are similar to those of genus Eristalis, Eristalinus, Anasimyia, Lejops and Parhelophilus. When fully grown, the rat-tailed maggots leave the water and make a small oval chamber in damp earth nearby. Its skin hardens and protects the pupae inside.

== Distribution ==
Helophilus is mainly distributed in Europe, North America, Asia and New Zealand. There are a few obversations in Africa and South America.

The climate could influence the distribution. Helophilus tends to inhabit warm and wet places, and the adults prefer sunny places to sunbathe, such as the fresh leaves of Cow Parsley in Europe.

== New Zealand ==
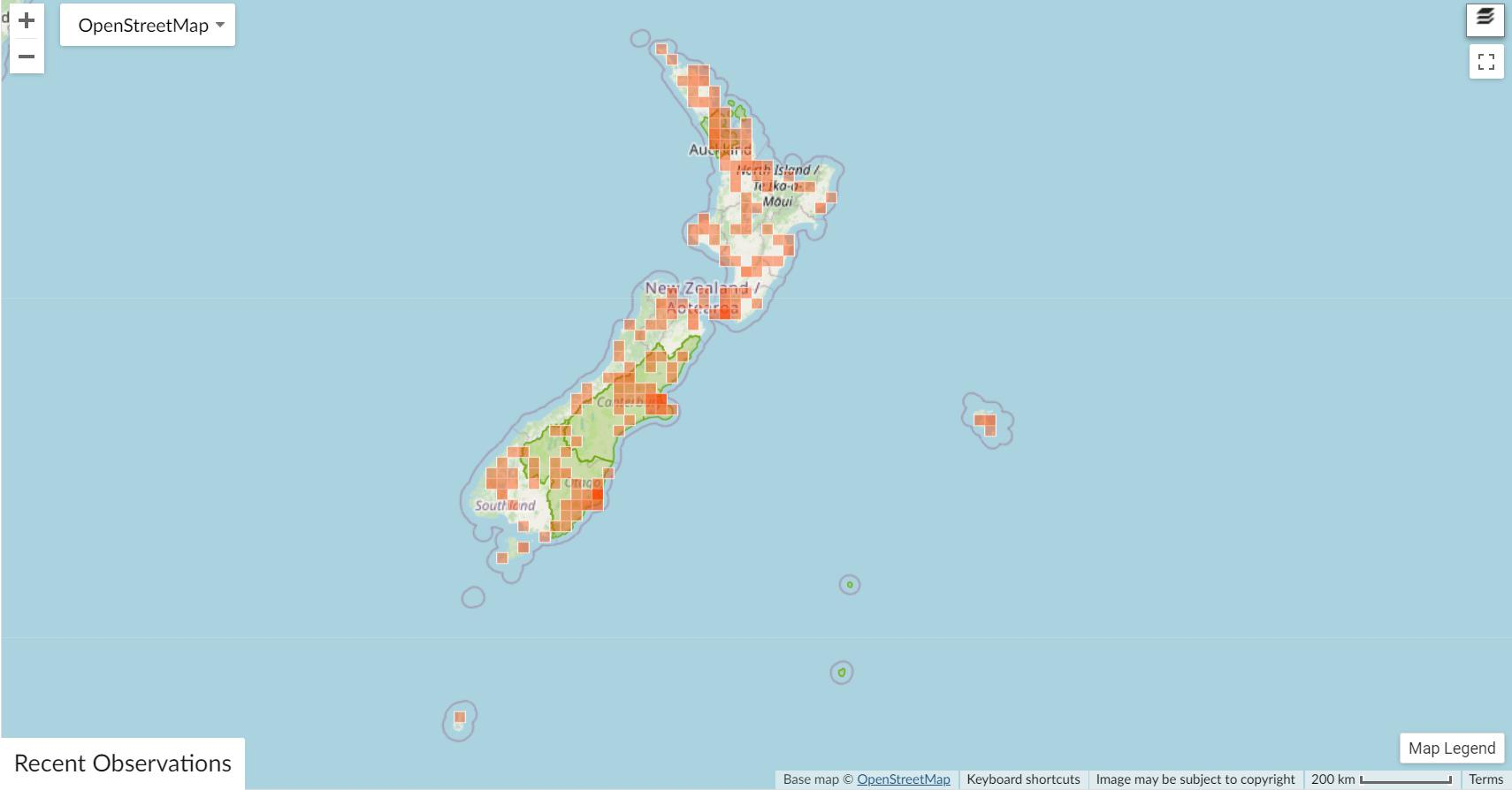
Distribution map of iNaturalist Helophilus species sightings in New Zealand

The helophilus in New Zealand comprises 12 species, of which five species (H. antipodus, H.hochstetteri, H. seelandicus, H. cingulatus, H. campbelli) are endemic. The endemic New Zealand species are under the oldest genus-group name (Pilinascia), as a subgenus of Helophilus. These species are pollinators of endemic plants. It has a significant impact on the reproduction of endemic endangered plants. H. antipodus is a pollinator of the endemic orchid Dendrobium cunninghamii on the main island. H. hochstetteri serves as a synergistic pollinator alongside honey bees for kiwifruit.

=== Distribution ===
In New Zealand, Helophilus is distributed in all its territory, including smaller islands.

== Species ==
Subgenus: Helophilus

- H. affinis Wahlberg, 1844
- H. bilinearis Williston, 1887
- H. borealis Stæger, 1845
- H. bottnicus Wahlberg, 1844
- H. celeber Osten Sacken, 1882
- H. consimilis Malm, 1863
- H. continuus Loew, 1854
- H. contractus (Claussen & Pedersen, 1980)
- H. distinctus Williston, 1887
- H. fasciatus Walker, 1849
- H. frutetorum (Fabricius, 1775)
- H. groenlandicus (Fabricius, 1780)
- H. hybridus Loew, 1846
- H. insignis Violovitsh, 1979
- H. intentus Curran and Fluke, 1922
- H. interpunctus (Harris, 1776)
- H. kurentzovi (Violovitsh, 1960)
- H. lapponicus Wahlberg, 1844
- H. latifrons Loew, 1863
- H. lineatus (Fabricius, 1787)
- H. lunulatus Meigen, 1822
- H. neoaffinis Fluke, 1949
- H. obscurus Loew, 1863
- H. oxycanus (Walker, 1852)
- H. parallelus (Harris, 1776)
- H. pendulus (Linnaeus, 1758)
- H. perfidiosus (Hunter, 1897)
- H. pilosus Hunter, 1897
- H. relictus (Curran & Fluke, 1926)
- H. sapporensis Matsumura, 1911
- H. sibiricus Smirnov, 1923
- H. stipatus Walker, 1849
- H. transfugus (Linnaeus, 1758)
- H. trivittatus (Fabricius, 1805)
- H. turanicus Smirnov, 1923
- H. versicolor (Fabricius, 1794)
- H. virgatus Coquillett, 1898

Subgenus: Pilinasica

- H. antipodus Schiner, 1868
- H. campbelli (Miller, 1921)
- H. campbellicus Hutton, 1902
- H. cargilli Miller, 1911
- H. chathamensis Hutton, 1901
- H. cingulatus Fabricius, 1775
- H. hectori Miller, 1924
- H. hochstetteri Nowicki, 1875
- H. ineptus Walker, 1849
- H. montanus (Miller, 1921)
- H. seelandicus Gmelin, 1790
- H. taruensis Miller, 1924
