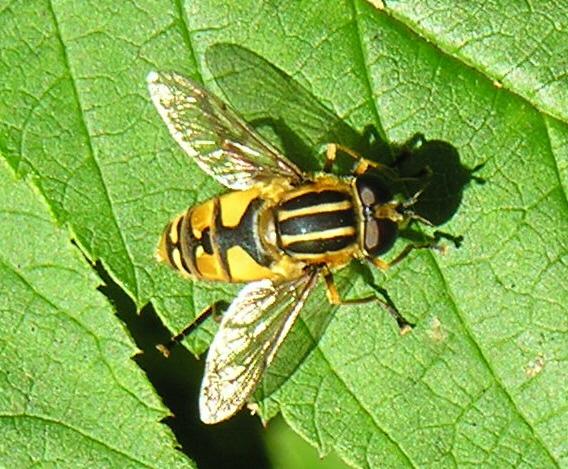

Scientific classification
- Kingdom: Animalia
- Phylum: Arthropoda
- Class: Insecta
- Order: Diptera
- Family: Syrphidae
- Genus: Helophilus
- Species: H. affinis

Binomial name
- Helophilus affinis Wahlberg, 1844

= Helophilus affinis =

Species of fly

Helophilus affinis is a European species of hoverfly.
