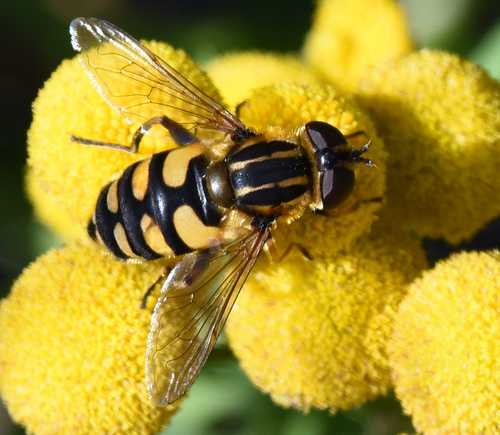

Scientific classification
- Kingdom: Animalia
- Phylum: Arthropoda
- Class: Insecta
- Order: Diptera
- Family: Syrphidae
- Genus: Helophilus
- Species: H. obscurus

Binomial name
- Helophilus obscurus Loew, 1863

= Helophilus obscurus =

Species of fly

Helophilus obscurus (Loew, 1863), the obscure marsh fly, is a common species of syrphid fly observed throughout Canada and the northern United States and Rocky Mountains. Hoverflies can remain nearly motionless in flight. The adults are also known as flower flies for they are commonly found on flowers, from which they get both energy-giving nectar and protein-rich pollen. The larvae of this genus are associated with wet decaying organic material, particularly accumulations of decaying vegetation in ponds and mud and farmyard manure or silage the larvae of this species are not known.

== Description ==
For terminology Speight key to genera and glossary

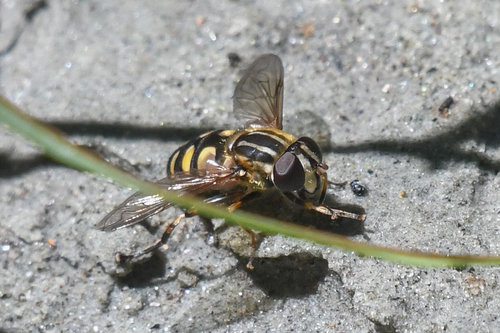
H.obscurus

Size

Length 10–13.5 mm (0.39–0.53 in)

Head

The face is orange-yellow, with a median black stripe that reaches almost to the antennae. The oral margin and cheeks, are shining black. The yellow portions of the face and frons are densely covered in yellow pollen. The pollen on the face is usually pale. The face profile is moderately excavated on the upper two-thirds, and slightly retreating on the lower portion.
The frons is narrow above and on the upper half or more of the narrow portion, except the venter, is covered in black pile, and elsewhere has yellow pile. The female frons is somewhat narrowed above, with black pile only on the upper half, and is rarely almost to the antennae.
The antennae are black and the third joint (flagellum) is largely or almost wholly red, with the upper and apical margins brown. The arista is orange-yellow. Males have eyes that are separated. The occiput is yellow pollinose on about the upper half, with the lower half covered in greyish yellow pollen and white hair.

Thorax

The scutum is black, with side margins and a pair of broadly separated yellow to pale yellow vittae. The vittae tend to narrow behind the suture and are sometimes interrupted there. There are also two wider spots just before the scutellum. The scutellum is translucent brownish, with a reddish apex. The thorax has yellow pile with the scutellum having short, abundant black pile except on its margins. The pleura are greyish yellow pollinose.

Abdomen

The abdomen of the male has three pairs of more or less oval spots. The first pair is large and somewhat triangular, while the last pair is slightly lunulate. The abdomen of the female has four pairs of yellow spots, which are more transverse than the ones in the male. The spots on the third segment of the female abdomen only reach the sides in front, and the pollinose bands on the fourth segment are more oval and scarcely concave in front, not lunulate. The basal corners of the fifth segment have transverse, pollinose triangles that are narrowly separated in the middle in females. The male abdomen is opaque black. The narrow apex of the second, the apex of the third, and the broad apex of the fourth segments are shining. The second segment is yellow, except the black on the broad apex, broad median stripe, and base. The black on the base is rather rounded laterally and broadly separated from the side margins. The base of the third segment has a rather broad, sub-oval spot on either side, and the fourth segment has a broad, slightly lunulate yellow pollinose spot on either side sub-basally. The apices of the segments are successively more widely reddish. The pile is black, with yellow in front of the hind margin of the yellow markings on each segment and on the sides of the fourth segment. The genitalia are usually black, reddish in only one specimen.

Wings

The wings are hyaline or tinged with yellow. The stigma is brownish. Squamae are pale yellow, with a yellow fringe. The halteres are pale yellow.

Legs

The legs are mostly black with some areas of yellow or reddish-yellow. The apices of the front four femora and the first two joints of the middle tarsi are yellow or reddish-yellow, along with the basal third to half of the front tibiae and all the middle tibiae. The hind femora may have a narrow sub-apical band, their bases, the basal third of the hind tibiae, and sometimes a narrow median band that is yellow or reddish.
