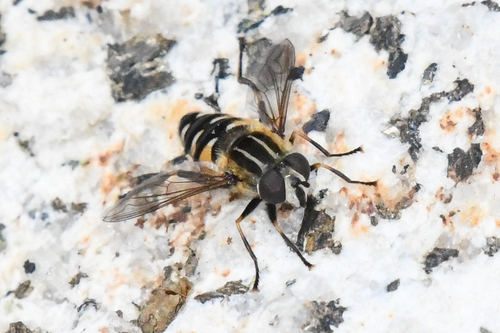
- H. groenlandicus

Scientific classification
- Kingdom: Animalia
- Phylum: Arthropoda
- Class: Insecta
- Order: Diptera
- Family: Syrphidae
- Genus: Helophilus
- Species: H. groenlandicus

Binomial name
- Helophilus groenlandicus (Fabricius, 1780)

Synonyms
- Tabanus groenlandicus Fabricius, 1780

= Helophilus groenlandicus =

Species of fly

Helophilus groenlandicus, the Black-margined Marsh Fly, is a common species of syrphid fly. Hoverflies can remain nearly motionless in flight. The adults are also known as flower flies for they are commonly found on flowers, from which they get both energy-giving nectar and protein-rich pollen. Though common the larvae of this species like many other Helophilus are not known but the larvae of other species in this genus are associated with wet decaying organic material, particularly accumulations of decaying vegetation in ponds and mud and are a so-called rat-tailed type.

== Distribution ==
It is found in the northern Holarctic, the Baltic countries, the northern Russia, Siberia, Greenland and North America. In Great Britain it is only rarely found in Scotland.
