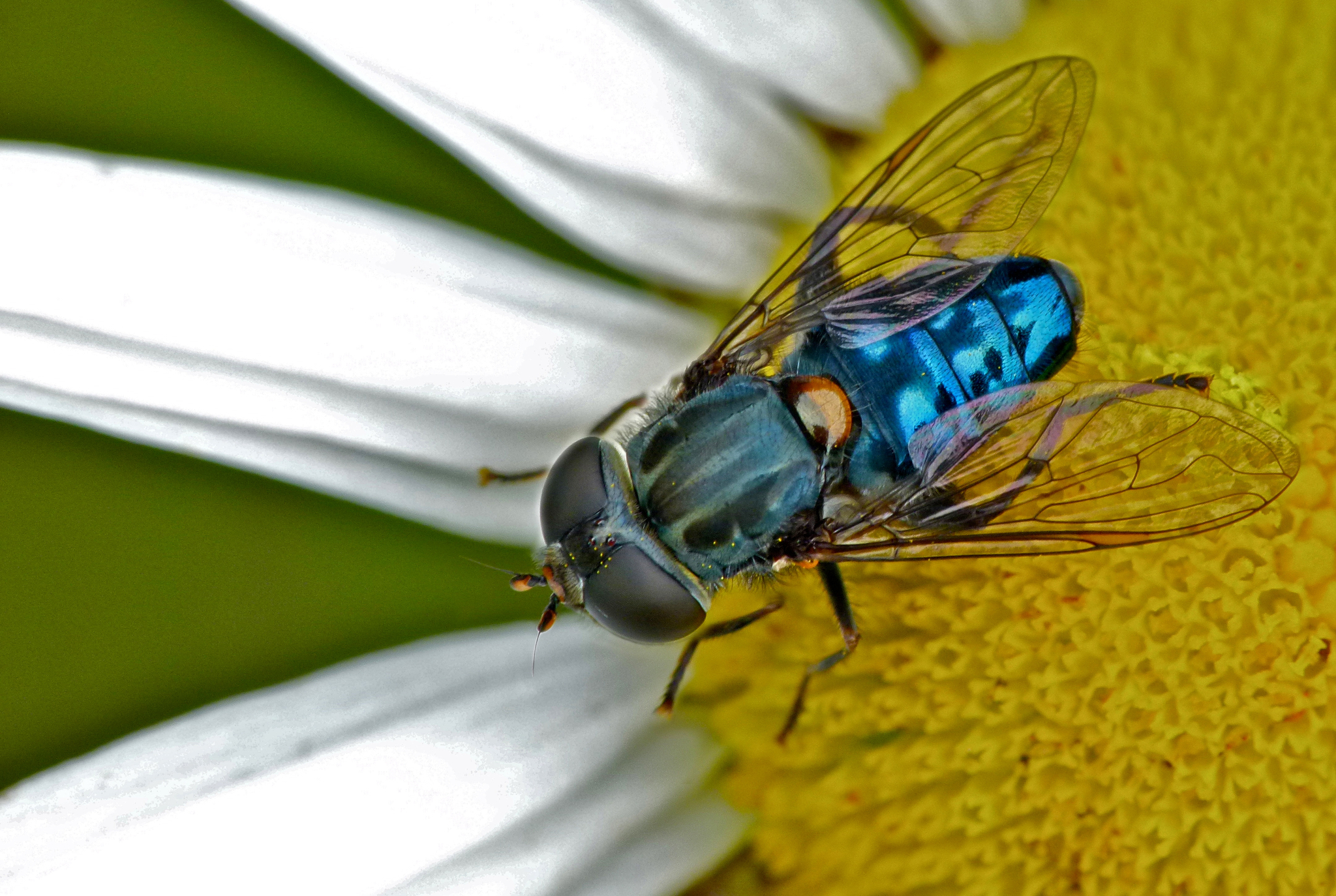

Scientific classification
- Kingdom: Animalia
- Phylum: Arthropoda
- Clade: Pancrustacea
- Class: Insecta
- Order: Diptera
- Family: Syrphidae
- Genus: Helophilus
- Species: H. hochstetteri

Binomial name
- Helophilus hochstetteri Nowicki, 1875

= Helophilus hochstetteri =

Species of fly

Helophilus hochstetteri, commonly called the metallic blue hoverfly, is a species of hoverfly endemic to New Zealand named for its shiny blue colour. It is a pollinator, feeding on nectar.

== Taxonomy ==
First described in 1875 by Maksymilian Nowicki. The genus Helophilus is a diverse genus containing hoverflies mostly from the northern hemisphere with H. hochstetteri being the only one in New Zealand.

There are 6 species of insect belonging to the family Syrphidae in New Zealand including H. hochstetteri.

== Distribution and habitat ==
H. hochstetteri is found all throughout the mainland New Zealand, both the North and South islands. The name of the genus (Helophilus) is derived from Greek meaning "marsh-lover", named for the preferred habitat of the species in this group.

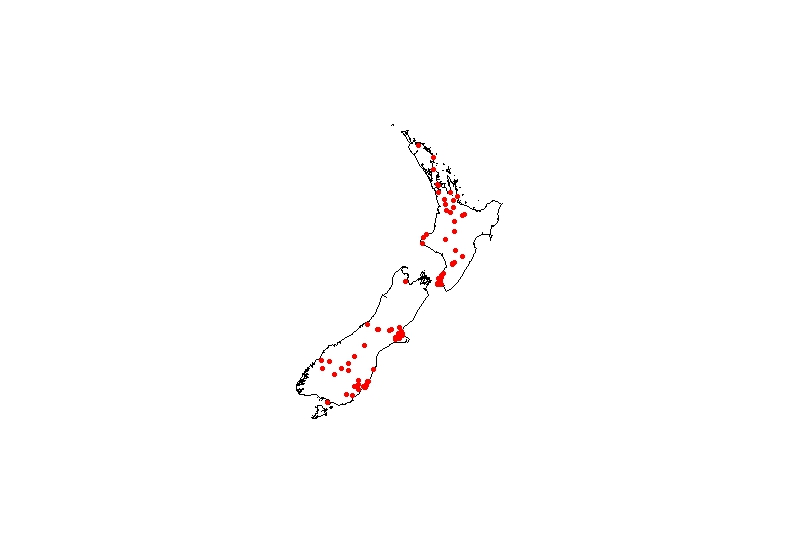
The distribution of Helophilus hochstetteri sightings in New Zealand from iNaturalist.

== Behaviour ==
H. hochstetteri is a diurnal species of hoverfly.

H. hochstetteri is often seen on flowers collecting pollen and nectar. In New Zealand H. hochstetteri amongst other flies and solitary bees have been observed pollinating kiwifruit Actinidia chinensis (both var. deliciosa "Hayward" and var. chinensis "Zesy002") as effectively as honeybees.
