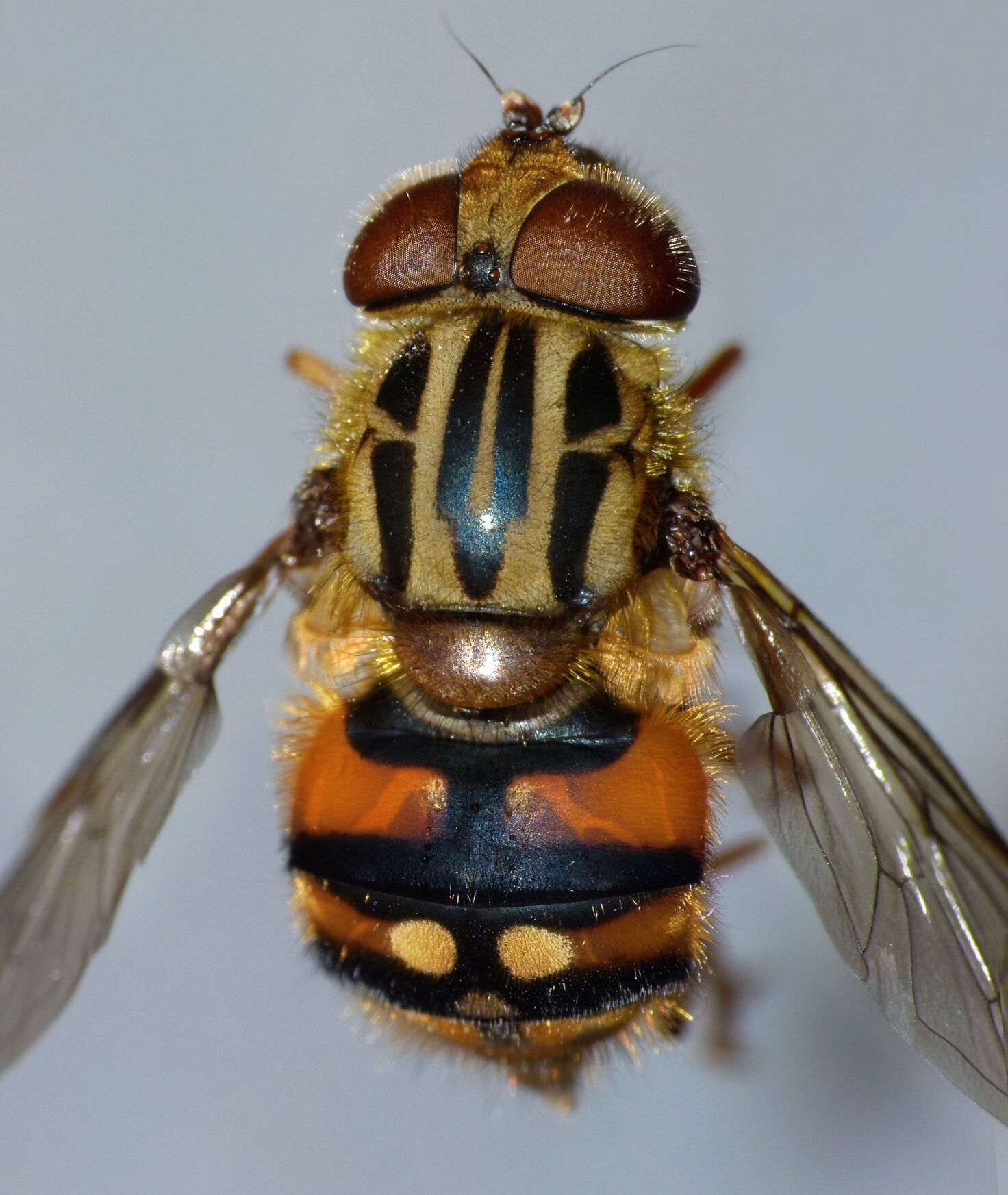

Scientific classification
- Kingdom: Animalia
- Phylum: Arthropoda
- Class: Insecta
- Order: Diptera
- Family: Syrphidae
- Genus: Helophilus
- Species: H. campbelli

Binomial name
- Helophilus campbelli (Miller, 1921)

Synonyms
- Myiatropa campbelli

= Helophilus campbelli =

Species of fly

Helophilus campbelli is a species of hover fly endemic to New Zealand.

== Taxonomy ==
This species was first described as Myiatropa campbelli in 1921 by New Zealand entomologist David Miller. It has since been transferred to the Helophilus genus, which contains numerous other species endemic to New Zealand.

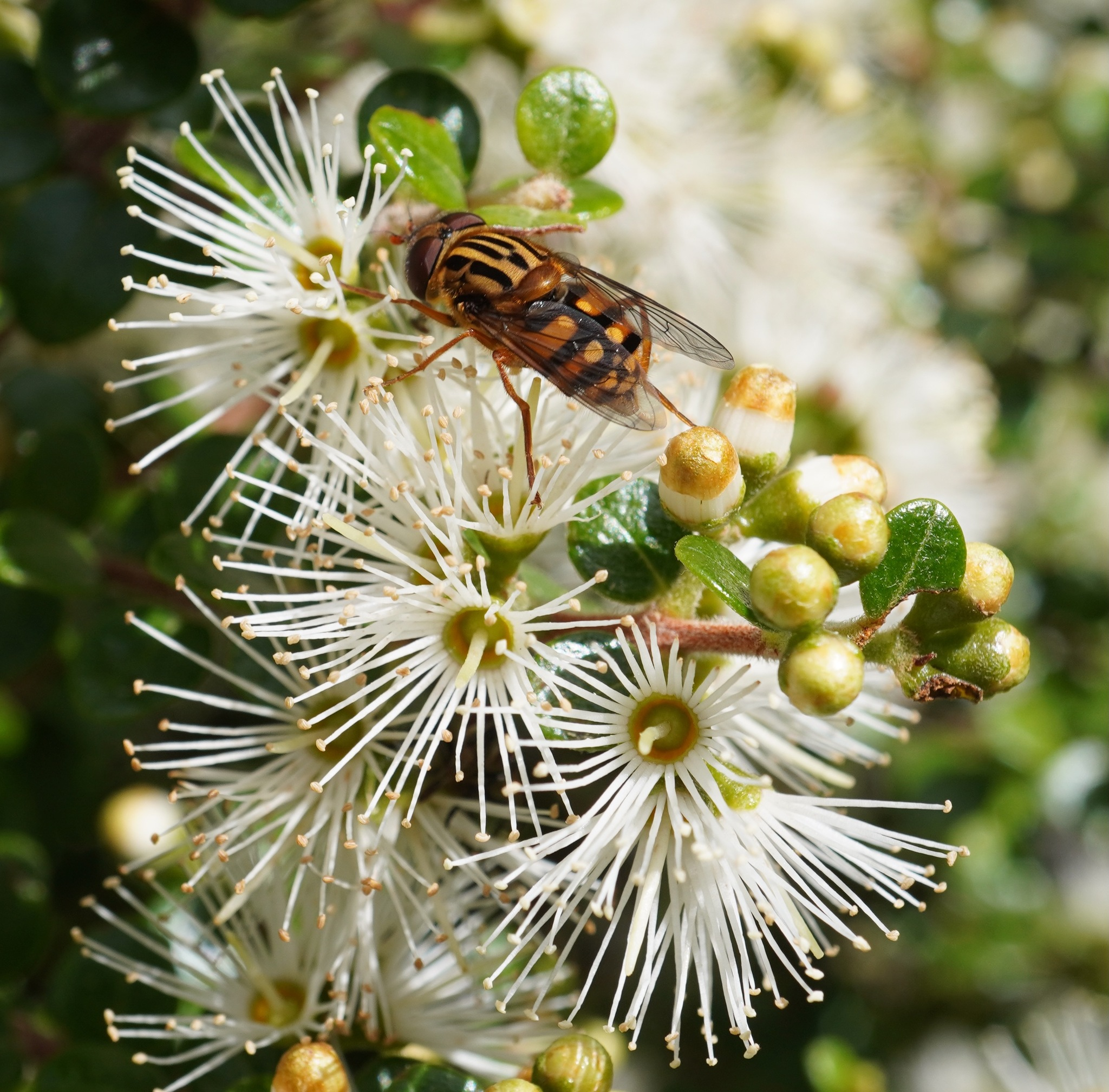
Helophilus campbelli feeding on flower

== Description ==
The female is recorded at 14 mm in length. They are nearly identical to Helophilus cargilli. The eyes are covered in golden hairs. Along the upper surface of the thorax there are yellowish with three black stripes running along it. Overall, the legs are orange-red except for the base of the femur, which is blackish. The abdomen has a broad oval shape. The base colour of the abdomen is black with orange markings in the second, third and fourth segments. There are also yellowish spots on the abdomen at the third and fourth segments.

== Distribution ==
It is endemic to New Zealand, where it has only been recorded from scattered localities in the North Island and South Island.
