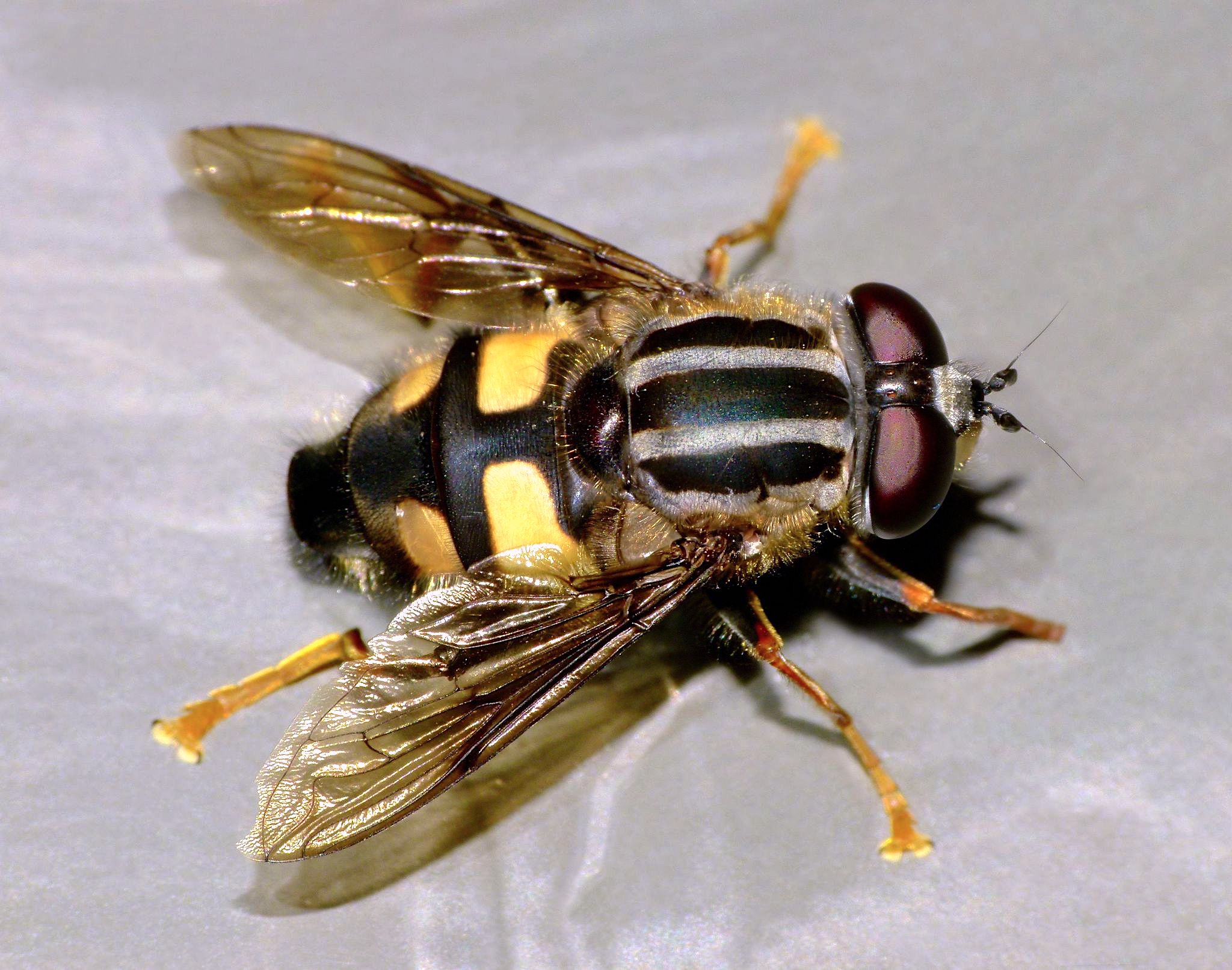

Scientific classification
- Kingdom: Animalia
- Phylum: Arthropoda
- Class: Insecta
- Order: Diptera
- Family: Syrphidae
- Genus: Helophilus
- Species: H. seelandicus

Binomial name
- Helophilus seelandicus (Gmelin, 1790)

Synonyms
- Musca seelandica Gemlin, 1790

= Helophilus seelandicus =

Species of fly

Helophilus seelandicus, commonly known as the three-lined hoverfly, is a hoverfly endemic to New Zealand. The common name corresponds to the three black lines behind the insect's head.

== Taxonomy ==
This species was first described by Johann Friedrich Gmelin in 1790 and named Musca seelandica. The taxonomy of this species was most recently discussed by F. Christian Thompson in 2008.

== Description ==
The adult fly is approximately 15 mm in length.

== Distribution ==
This species is endemic to New Zealand.

== Life cycle ==
H. seelandicus maggots live in water with decaying vegetation, animals or dung.

== Interaction with humans ==
Despite being native to New Zealand, this species is commonly reported to the Ministry of Primary Industries Pest and Disease Hotline.
