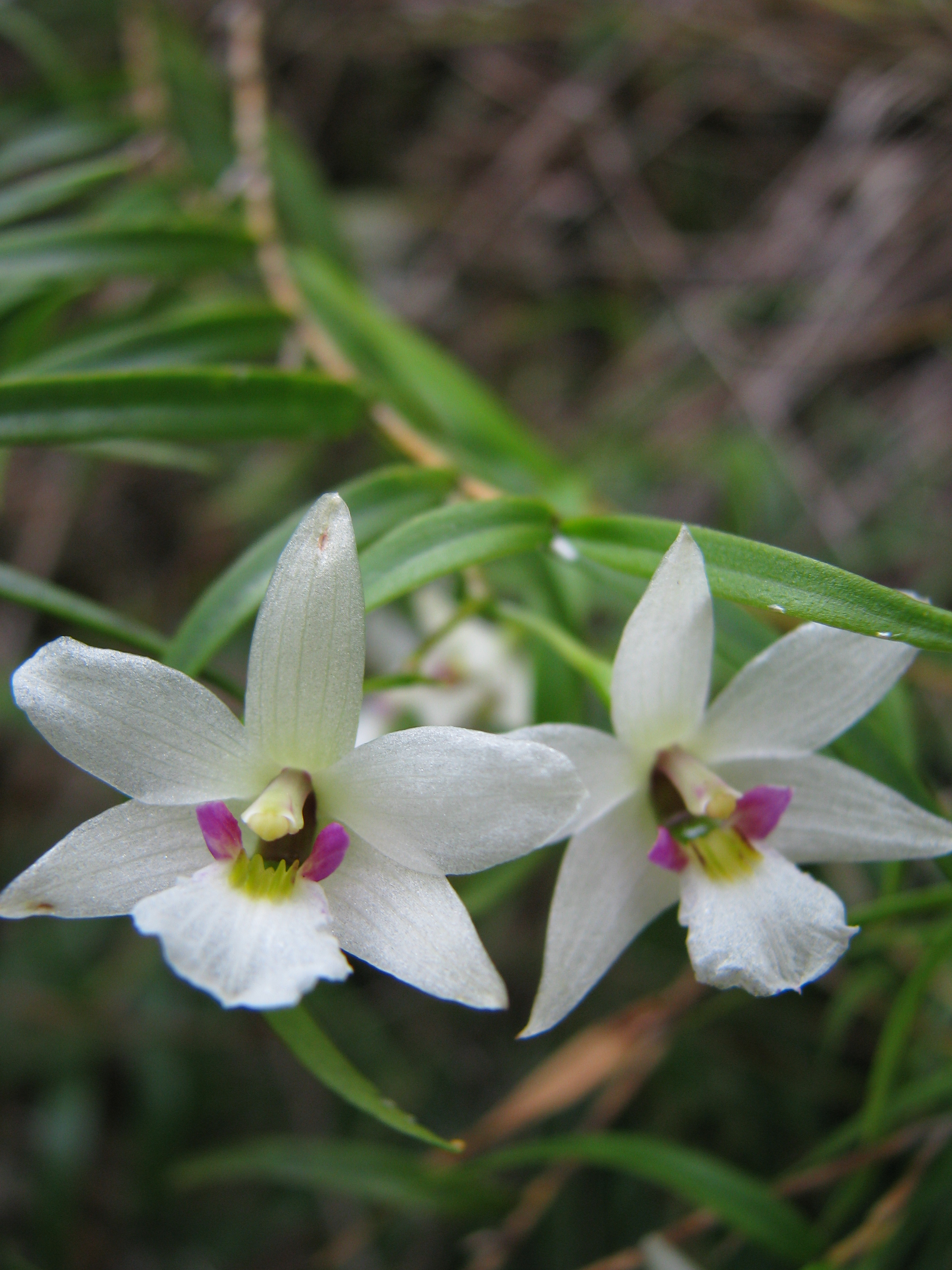
- In East Harbour Regional Park

Conservation status
- Not Threatened (NZ TCS)

Scientific classification
- Kingdom: Plantae
- Clade: Tracheophytes
- Clade: Angiosperms
- Clade: Monocots
- Order: Asparagales
- Family: Orchidaceae
- Subfamily: Epidendroideae
- Genus: Dendrobium
- Species: D. cunninghamii

Binomial name
- Dendrobium cunninghamii Lindl.

Synonyms
- Callista cunninghamii (Lindl.) Kuntze; Winika cunninghamii (Lindl.) M.A.Clem., D.L.Jones & Molloy; Dendrobium biflorum A.Rich. nom. illeg.; Dendrobium lessonii Colenso

= Dendrobium cunninghamii =

Winika

Species of orchid

Dendrobium cunninghamii, commonly known as winika, pekapeka, Christmas orchid, bamboo orchid or ladies slipper orchid, is a species of epiphytic orchids that is endemic to New Zealand. It is commonly found growing in rainforest in the North, South, Stewart and Chatham Islands and normally flowers in summer and early autumn.

== Description ==
Dendrobium cunninghamii is an epiphytic or lithophytic orchid herb that forms tufts up 2.0 m (7 ft) wide with wiry, cane-like stems up to 1.0 m (3 ft) long and 7 mm (0.3 in) in diameter. The rhizomes are similar to the stems and produce many roots. The leaves are narrow linear, 30–50 mm (1–2 in) long and about 3 mm (0.12 in) wide. Up to eight flowers 20–25 mm (0.8–1 in) wide are borne on a short lateral flowering stem. The petals and sepals are white but some parts of the labellum are rose pink, purplish and green. The labellum has three lobes. The side lobes are erect, relatively small and pink or purple and the middle lobe has four or five greenish or yellowish ridges along its midline. Flowering occurs from December to January.

== Taxonomy and naming ==
Dendrobium cunninghamii was first formally discovered in 1835 by John Lindley and the description was published in Edwards's Botanical Register. The specific epithet (cunninghamii) honours Allan Cunningham.

David Jones, Mark Clements and Brian Molloy proposed changing the name of this species to Winika cunninghamii but the change has not been accepted by Plants of the World Online.

"Winika is the accepted old Māori language name for this orchid. The name Te Winika was given to the sacred war canoe of the Tainui people because this orchid grew on the tōtara tree (Podocarpus totara) which was hollowed out to form the hull. We assign the feminine gender to it—Winika cunninghamii. The Māori Queen, Te Arikinui Dame Te Atairangikaahu, granted consent to use the name Winika, because of its particular cultural significance to her Tainui people."

== Distribution and habitat ==
Winika is usually an epiphyte on forest trees but sometimes also on fallen logs. It sometimes grows on rocks and cliff faces, even on brick or concrete walls. It is found on both the North and South Islands of New Zealand but also on the Stewart and Chatham Islands.

== Cultural references ==
In 1990, New Zealand Post released a New Zealand native orchid miniature sheet to support the New Zealand 1990 World Stamp Exhibition held in Auckland. Winika was one of the stamps (40c) on the miniature sheet. The others were the sun orchid (Thelymitra pulchella), spider orchid (Corybas macranthus) and greenhood orchid (Pterostylis banksii).

== Conservation status ==
Under the New Zealand Threat Classification System, this species is listed as "Not Threatened".
