= Satanica =

Satanica or La Satánica may refer to:

== Books ==
- La Satanica (ラ・サタニカ), Japanese manga
- Satanica, art magazine by Christeene Vale and others 2012

== Film and TV ==
- Rapsodia satanica, 1915 silent film directed by Nino Oxilia featuring Lyda Borelli in a female version of Faust, music by Pietro Mascagni
- La Satánica, 1973 film directed by Alfredo B. Crevenna
- La Satánica, 1971 Mexican telenovela also featuring Raúl Ramírez
- Satanica, wrestling move used by Shuu Shibutani

== Music ==
- Satanica (album), 1999 album by Behemoth
- "Diva Satanica", 2009 song by Arch Enemy from Burning Bridges

== Plants ==
- Solidago satanica, the devil's goldenrod, is a rare North American plant species in the sunflower family

== Insects ==
- Melanodexia satanica, a fly in the genus Melanodexia
