= M. grandis =

M. grandis may refer to:

- Meconopsis grandis, the blue Poppy, a flowering plant found in Bhutan
- Melanella grandis, a very small ectoparasitic sea snail species in the genus Melanella
- Melanodexia grandis, a fly species in the genus Melanodexia
- Menegazzia grandis, a lichen species found in Australia
- Mexitlia grandis, a spider species in the genus Mexitlia found in Mexico
- Millettia grandis, a legume species found in South Africa
- Miohippus grandis, a prehistoric horse species found in now North America that lived from the late Eocene to early Miocene
- Moneta grandis, a spider species in the genus Moneta endemic to India
- Mullerornis grandis, an extinct elephant bird species found in Madagascar

== Synonyms ==
- Makalata grandis, a synonym for Toromys grandis, the giant tree rat or white-faced tree rat, a spiny rat species found in Brazil

== See also ==
- Grandis (disambiguation)
