= Pollenia bicolor =

Scientific classification
- Kingdom: Animalia
- Phylum: Arthropoda
- Class: Insecta
- Order: Diptera
- Family: Polleniidae
- Genus: Pollenia
- Species: P. bicolor

Binomial name
- Pollenia bicolor Robineau-Desvoidy, 1830

Synonyms
- Pollenia guernica Lehrer, 2007

Species of fly

Pollenia bicolor is a species of cluster fly in the family Polleniidae.

== Distribution ==
Andorra, France, Morocco, Portugal, Spain.
