= Pollenia semicinerea =

Scientific classification
- Kingdom: Animalia
- Phylum: Arthropoda
- Clade: Pancrustacea
- Class: Insecta
- Order: Diptera
- Family: Polleniidae
- Genus: Pollenia
- Species: P. semicinerea

Binomial name
- Pollenia semicinerea Villeneuve, 1911

Synonyms
- Pollenia bentalia Lehrer, 2007

Species of fly

Pollenia semicinerea is a species of cluster fly in the family Polleniidae.

== Distribution ==
Israel, Lebanon, Syria.
