= Pollenia mediterranea =

Scientific classification
- Kingdom: Animalia
- Phylum: Arthropoda
- Class: Insecta
- Order: Diptera
- Family: Polleniidae
- Genus: Pollenia
- Species: P. mediterranea

Binomial name
- Pollenia mediterranea Grunin 1966

Synonyms
- Nitellia hermoniella Lehrer, 2007

Species of fly

Pollenia mediterranea is a species of cluster fly in the family Polleniidae.

== Distribution ==
Israel, Italy.
