= Pollenia ruficrura =

Scientific classification
- Kingdom: Animalia
- Phylum: Arthropoda
- Class: Insecta
- Order: Diptera
- Family: Polleniidae
- Genus: Pollenia
- Species: P. ruficrura

Binomial name
- Pollenia ruficrura Rondani, 1862

Synonyms
- Nitellia ospedaliana Lehrer, 2007

Species of fly

Pollenia ruficrura is a species of cluster fly in the family Polleniidae.

== Distribution ==
France, Italy, Morocco.
