= Morinia doronici =

Scientific classification
- Kingdom: Animalia
- Phylum: Arthropoda
- Class: Insecta
- Order: Diptera
- Family: Polleniidae
- Genus: Morinia
- Species: M. doronici

Binomial name
- Morinia doronici (Scopoli, 1763)

Synonyms
- Musca doronici Scopoli, 1763; Musca melanoptera Fallén, 1817; Morinia velox Robineau-Desvoidy, 1830; Morinia fuscipennis Robineau-Desvoidy, 1830; Anthracomya geneji Rondani, 1856; Calobatemyia nigra Macquart, 1855

Species of fly

Morinia doronici is a species of cluster fly in the family Polleniidae.

== Distribution ==
Austria, Belgium, Czech Republic, Denmark, Finland, France, Germany, Greece, Hungary, Italy, Netherlands, Norway, Poland, Russia, Slovakia, Spain, Sweden, Switzerland, Ukraine.
