= Nesodexia corsicana =

Scientific classification
- Kingdom: Animalia
- Phylum: Arthropoda
- Class: Insecta
- Order: Diptera
- Family: Polleniidae
- Genus: Nesodexia
- Species: N. corsicana

Binomial name
- Nesodexia corsicana Villeneuve, 1911

Species of fly

Nesodexia corsicana is a species of cluster fly in the family Polleniidae.

== Distribution ==
France.
