= Dexopollenia chrysothrix =

Scientific classification
- Kingdom: Animalia
- Phylum: Arthropoda
- Clade: Pancrustacea
- Class: Insecta
- Order: Diptera
- Family: Polleniidae
- Genus: Dexopollenia
- Species: D. chrysothrix

Binomial name
- Dexopollenia chrysothrix Bezzi, 1927

Species of fly

Dexopollenia chrysothrix is a species of cluster fly in the family Polleniidae.

== Distribution ==
Australia.
