= Pollenia pectinata =

Scientific classification
- Kingdom: Animalia
- Phylum: Arthropoda
- Class: Insecta
- Order: Diptera
- Family: Polleniidae
- Genus: Pollenia
- Species: P. pectinata

Binomial name
- Pollenia pectinata 1966

Species of fly

Pollenia pectinata is a species of cluster fly in the family Polleniidae.

== Distribution ==
China, Mongolia, Poland, Russia.
