= Pollenia vera =

Scientific classification
- Kingdom: Animalia
- Phylum: Arthropoda
- Class: Insecta
- Order: Diptera
- Family: Polleniidae
- Genus: Pollenia
- Species: P. vera

Binomial name
- Pollenia vera Jacentkovsky, 1936

Synonyms
- Pseudopollenia latifrons Jacentkovsky, 1941

Species of fly

Pollenia vera is a species of cluster fly in the family Polleniidae.

== Distribution ==
Austria, Bulgaria, Czech Republic, France, Greece, Hungary, Moldova, Poland, Romania, Slovakia, Ukraine, Yugoslavia.
