= Dexopollenia luteola =

Scientific classification
- Kingdom: Animalia
- Phylum: Arthropoda
- Clade: Pancrustacea
- Class: Insecta
- Order: Diptera
- Family: Polleniidae
- Genus: Dexopollenia
- Species: D. luteola

Binomial name
- Dexopollenia luteola (Villeneuve, 1927)

Synonyms
- Pollenia luteola Villeneuve, 1927

Species of fly

Dexopollenia luteola is a species of cluster fly in the family Polleniidae found in Taiwan.
