= Pollenia moravica =

Scientific classification
- Kingdom: Animalia
- Phylum: Arthropoda
- Class: Insecta
- Order: Diptera
- Family: Polleniidae
- Genus: Pollenia
- Species: P. moravica

Binomial name
- Pollenia moravica (Jacentkovský, 1941)

Synonyms
- Chaetopollenia moravica Jacentkovský, 1941; Chaetopollenia pseudobisulca Jacentkovský, 1941

Species of fly

Pollenia moravica is a species of cluster fly in the family Polleniidae.

== Distribution ==
Austria, Croatia, Czech Republic, Hungary, Poland, Romania, Slovakia, Ukraine, Yugoslavia.
