= Morinia crassitarsis =

Scientific classification
- Kingdom: Animalia
- Phylum: Arthropoda
- Class: Insecta
- Order: Diptera
- Family: Polleniidae
- Genus: Morinia
- Species: M. crassitarsis

Binomial name
- Morinia crassitarsis (Villeneuve, 1936)

Synonyms
- Anthracomyia crassitarsis Villeneuve, 1936

Species of fly

Morinia crassitarsis is a species of cluster fly in the family Polleniidae.

== Distribution ==
China.
