= Pollenia townsendi =

Scientific classification
- Kingdom: Animalia
- Phylum: Arthropoda
- Class: Insecta
- Order: Diptera
- Family: Polleniidae
- Genus: Pollenia
- Species: P. townsendi

Binomial name
- Pollenia townsendi Senior-White, Aubertin & Smart, 1940

Species of fly

Pollenia townsendi, also known as "Ocrisia testacea", is a species of cluster fly in the family Polleniidae.

== Distribution ==
India.
