= Pollenia ponti =

Scientific classification
- Kingdom: Animalia
- Phylum: Arthropoda
- Class: Insecta
- Order: Diptera
- Family: Polleniidae
- Genus: Pollenia
- Species: P. ponti

Binomial name
- Pollenia ponti Rognes, 1991

Species of fly

Pollenia ponti is a species of cluster fly in the family Polleniidae.

== Distribution ==
It is found in Italy, Morocco, Portugal, Slovakia, Spain, Ukraine.
