= Dexopollenia fangensis =

Scientific classification
- Kingdom: Animalia
- Phylum: Arthropoda
- Class: Insecta
- Order: Diptera
- Family: Polleniidae
- Genus: Dexopollenia
- Species: D. fangensis

Binomial name
- Dexopollenia fangensis Kurahashi, 1995

Species of fly

Dexopollenia fangensis is a species of cluster fly in the family Polleniidae.

== Distribution ==
Vietnam, Thailand.
