= Xanthotryxus draco =

Scientific classification
- Kingdom: Animalia
- Phylum: Arthropoda
- Class: Insecta
- Order: Diptera
- Family: Polleniidae
- Genus: Xanthotryxus
- Species: X. draco

Binomial name
- Xanthotryxus draco Aldrich, 1930

Species of fly

Xanthotryxus draco is a species of cluster fly in the family Polleniidae.

== Distribution ==
China
