= Pollenia bezziana =

Scientific classification
- Kingdom: Animalia
- Phylum: Arthropoda
- Class: Insecta
- Order: Diptera
- Family: Polleniidae
- Genus: Pollenia
- Species: P. bezziana

Binomial name
- Pollenia bezziana Rognes 1992

Species of fly

Pollenia bezziana is a species of cluster fly in the family Polleniidae.

== Distribution ==
They are found in Italy.
