= Pollenia venturii =

Scientific classification
- Kingdom: Animalia
- Phylum: Arthropoda
- Class: Insecta
- Order: Diptera
- Family: Polleniidae
- Genus: Pollenia
- Species: P. venturii

Binomial name
- Pollenia venturii Zumpt, 1956

Synonyms
- Pollenia solitaria Grunin, 1970

Species of fly

Pollenia venturii is a species of cluster fly in the family Polleniidae.

== Distribution ==
France, Germany, Greece, Iran, Italy, Netherlands, Poland, Russia.
