= Dexopollenia testacea =

Scientific classification
- Kingdom: Animalia
- Phylum: Arthropoda
- Class: Insecta
- Order: Diptera
- Family: Polleniidae
- Genus: Dexopollenia
- Species: D. testacea

Binomial name
- Dexopollenia testacea Townsend, 1917

Species of fly

Dexopollenia testacea is a species of cluster fly in the family Polleniidae.

== Distribution ==
Nepal, India.
