= Morinia skufyini =

Scientific classification
- Kingdom: Animalia
- Phylum: Arthropoda
- Class: Insecta
- Order: Diptera
- Family: Polleniidae
- Genus: Morinia
- Species: M. skufyini

Binomial name
- Morinia skufyini Khitsova, 1983

Species of fly

Morinia skufyini is a species of cluster fly in the family Polleniidae.

== Distribution ==
Russia.
