= Pollenia hungarica =

Scientific classification
- Kingdom: Animalia
- Phylum: Arthropoda
- Class: Insecta
- Order: Diptera
- Family: Polleniidae
- Genus: Pollenia
- Species: P. hungarica

Binomial name
- Pollenia hungarica Rognes, 1987

Species of fly

Pollenia hungarica is a species of cluster fly in the family Polleniidae.

== Distribution ==
Austria, Czech Republic, Finland, France, Germany, Hungary, Italy, Latvia, Netherlands, Norway, Poland, Russia, Saudi Arabia, Slovakia, Sweden, Switzerland, Ukraine, Yugoslavia. Introduced to China.
