= Morinia piliparafacia =

Scientific classification
- Kingdom: Animalia
- Phylum: Arthropoda
- Class: Insecta
- Order: Diptera
- Family: Polleniidae
- Genus: Morinia
- Species: M. piliparafacia

Binomial name
- Morinia piliparafacia Fan, 1997

Species of fly

Morinia piliparafacia is a species of cluster fly in the family Polleniidae.

== Distribution ==
China.
