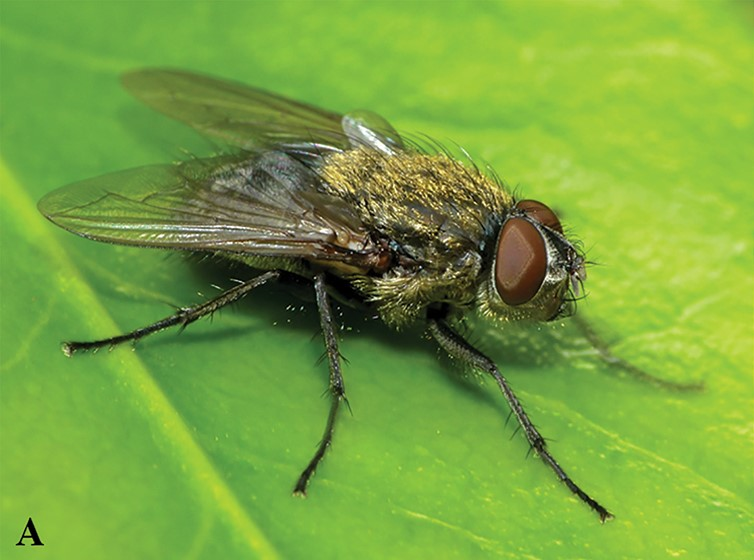

Scientific classification
- Kingdom: Animalia
- Phylum: Arthropoda
- Class: Insecta
- Order: Diptera
- Family: Polleniidae
- Genus: Pollenia
- Species: P. pediculata

Binomial name
- Pollenia pediculata Macquart 1834

Synonyms
- Pollenia coerulescens Macquart, 1834; Pollenia obscura Bigot, 1887; Pollenia pseudorudis Rognes, 1985

= Pollenia pediculata =

Species of fly

Pollenia pediculata is a species of cluster fly in the family Polleniidae.

== Distribution ==
It is found across Eurasia and has been introduced to South Africa, Australasia, New Zealand and North America.
