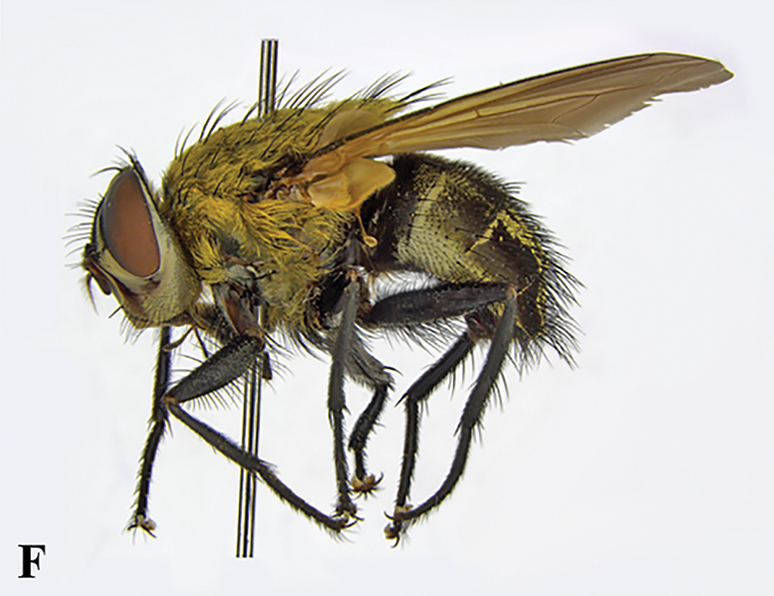

Scientific classification
- Kingdom: Animalia
- Phylum: Arthropoda
- Class: Insecta
- Order: Diptera
- Family: Polleniidae
- Genus: Xanthotryxus
- Species: X. mongol

Binomial name
- Xanthotryxus mongol Aldrich, 1930

= Xanthotryxus mongol =

Species of fly

Xanthotryxus mongol is a species of cluster fly in the family Polleniidae.

== Distribution ==
Japan, South Korea, China.
