= Dexopollenia yuphae =

Scientific classification
- Kingdom: Animalia
- Phylum: Arthropoda
- Class: Insecta
- Order: Diptera
- Family: Polleniidae
- Genus: Dexopollenia
- Species: D. yuphae

Binomial name
- Dexopollenia yuphae Kurahashi, 1995

Species of fly

Dexopollenia yuphae is a species of cluster fly in the family Polleniidae.

== Distribution ==
Laos, Vietnam, Thailand.
