= Pollenia ibalia =

Scientific classification
- Kingdom: Animalia
- Phylum: Arthropoda
- Class: Insecta
- Order: Diptera
- Family: Polleniidae
- Genus: Pollenia
- Species: P. ibalia

Binomial name
- Pollenia ibalia Séguy, 1930

Synonyms
- Pollenia rungsi Séguy, 1953; Pollenia funebris Villeneuve, 1933

Species of fly

Pollenia ibalia is a species of cluster fly in the family Polleniidae.

== Distribution ==
Morocco. Introduced to Alaska.
