= Melanodexia tristis =

Scientific classification
- Kingdom: Animalia
- Phylum: Arthropoda
- Class: Insecta
- Order: Diptera
- Family: Polleniidae
- Genus: Melanodexia
- Species: M. tristis

Binomial name
- Melanodexia tristis Williston, 1893

Species of fly

Melanodexia tristis is a species of cluster fly in the family Polleniidae.

== Distribution ==
United States.
