= Xanthotryxus uniapicalis =

Scientific classification
- Kingdom: Animalia
- Phylum: Arthropoda
- Class: Insecta
- Order: Diptera
- Family: Polleniidae
- Genus: Xanthotryxus
- Species: X. uniapicalis

Binomial name
- Xanthotryxus uniapicalis Fan, 1992

Species of fly

Xanthotryxus uniapicalis is a species of cluster fly in the family Polleniidae.

== Distribution ==
China.
