= Morinia proceripenisa =

Scientific classification
- Kingdom: Animalia
- Phylum: Arthropoda
- Class: Insecta
- Order: Diptera
- Family: Polleniidae
- Genus: Morinia
- Species: M. proceripenisa

Binomial name
- Morinia proceripenisa Feng, 2004

Species of fly

Morinia proceripenisa is a species of cluster fly in the family Polleniidae.

== Distribution ==
China.
