= Dexopollenia monsdulitae =

Scientific classification
- Kingdom: Animalia
- Phylum: Arthropoda
- Clade: Pancrustacea
- Class: Insecta
- Order: Diptera
- Family: Polleniidae
- Genus: Dexopollenia
- Species: D. monsdulitae

Binomial name
- Dexopollenia monsdulitae (Senior-White, Aubertin & Smart, 1940)

Synonyms
- Pollenia monsdulitae Senior-White, Aubertin & Smart, 1940

Species of fly

Dexopollenia monsdulitae is a species of cluster fly in the family Polleniidae.

== Distribution ==
Malaysia.
