= Pollenia bartaki =

Scientific classification
- Kingdom: Animalia
- Phylum: Arthropoda
- Class: Insecta
- Order: Diptera
- Family: Polleniidae
- Genus: Pollenia
- Species: P. bartaki

Binomial name
- Pollenia bartaki Rognes, 2016

Species of fly

Pollenia bartaki is a species of cluster fly in the family Polleniidae.

== Distribution ==
The species is found in Jordan.
