= Pollenia mesopotamica =

Scientific classification
- Kingdom: Animalia
- Phylum: Arthropoda
- Class: Insecta
- Order: Diptera
- Family: Polleniidae
- Genus: Pollenia
- Species: P. mesopotamica

Binomial name
- Pollenia mesopotamica Mawlood & Abdul-Rassoul, 2009

Species of fly

Pollenia mesopotamica is a species of cluster fly in the family Polleniidae.

== Distribution ==
Iraq.
