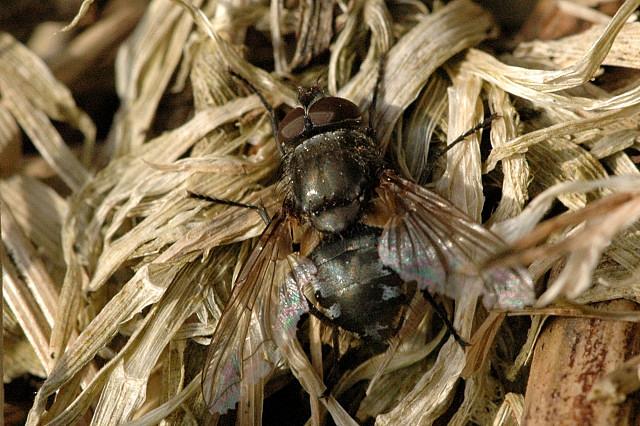

Scientific classification
- Kingdom: Animalia
- Phylum: Arthropoda
- Class: Insecta
- Order: Diptera
- Family: Polleniidae
- Genus: Pollenia
- Species: P. vagabunda

Binomial name
- Pollenia vagabunda (Meigen 1826)

Synonyms
- Musca vagabunda Meigen 1826

= Pollenia vagabunda =

Species of fly

Pollenia vagabunda is a species of blow fly in the family Polleniidae. It is widespread in Europe and can be found on carrion, although not associated with any specific stages of decomposition. P. vagabunda has also been found in North America, first being discovered there in 1958, with a range from the east coast to British Columbia.

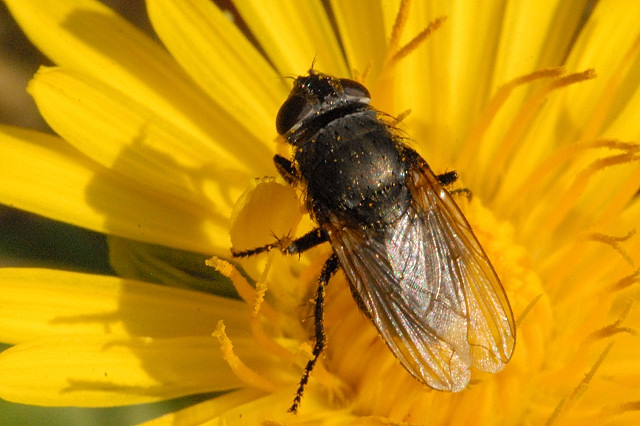
