= Pollenia atramentaria =

Scientific classification
- Kingdom: Animalia
- Phylum: Arthropoda
- Class: Insecta
- Order: Diptera
- Family: Polleniidae
- Genus: Pollenia
- Species: P. atramentaria

Binomial name
- Pollenia atramentaria (Meigen, 1826)

Synonyms
- Musca atramentaria Meigen, 1826; Pollenia levis Rondani, 1862

Species of fly

Pollenia atramentaria is a species of cluster fly in the family Polleniidae.

== Distribution ==
Andorra, Austria, Belarus, Czech Republic, France, Germany, Italy, Latvia, Lithuania, Netherlands, Poland, Romania, Russia, Slovakia, Spain, Switzerland, Ukraine.
