= Pollenia hazarae =

Scientific classification
- Kingdom: Animalia
- Phylum: Arthropoda
- Class: Insecta
- Order: Diptera
- Family: Polleniidae
- Genus: Pollenia
- Species: P. hazarae

Binomial name
- Pollenia hazarae (Senior-White, 1923)

Species of fly

Pollenia hazarae is a species of cluster fly in the family Polleniidae.

== Distribution ==
India, Pakistan.
