= Dexopollenia maculata =

Scientific classification
- Kingdom: Animalia
- Phylum: Arthropoda
- Class: Insecta
- Order: Diptera
- Family: Polleniidae
- Genus: Dexopollenia
- Species: D. maculata

Binomial name
- Dexopollenia maculata (Villeneuve, 1933)

Synonyms
- Lispoparea maculata Villeneuve, 1933

Species of fly

Dexopollenia maculata is a species of cluster fly in the family Polleniidae.

== Distribution ==
Taiwan, China.
