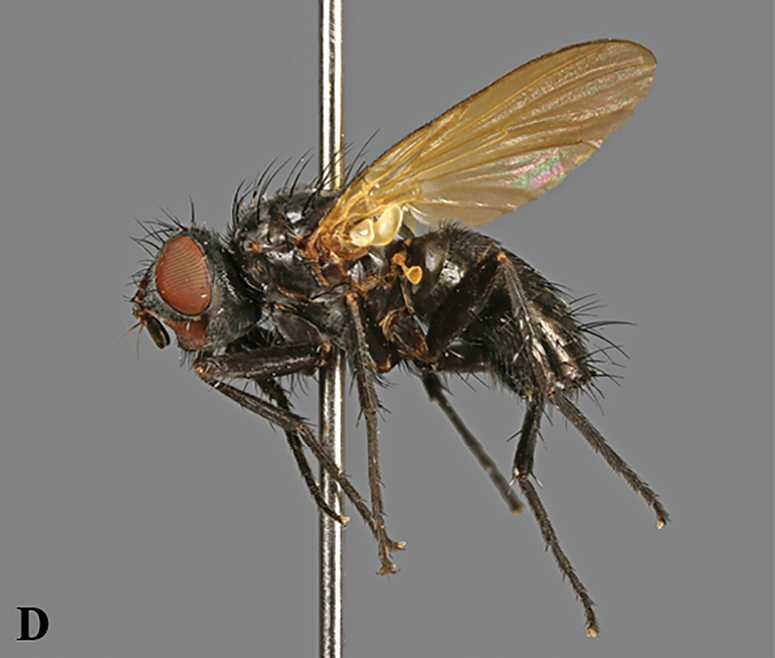

Scientific classification
- Kingdom: Animalia
- Phylum: Arthropoda
- Class: Insecta
- Order: Diptera
- Family: Polleniidae
- Genus: Morinia
- Species: M. tsitsikamma

Binomial name
- Morinia tsitsikamma Cerretti, Stireman, Badano, Gisondi, Rognes, Lo Giudice & Pape, 2019

= Morinia tsitsikamma =

Species of fly

Morinia tsitsikamma is a species of cluster fly in the family Polleniidae.

== Distribution ==
South Africa.
