= Morinia longirostris =

Scientific classification
- Kingdom: Animalia
- Phylum: Arthropoda
- Class: Insecta
- Order: Diptera
- Family: Polleniidae
- Genus: Morinia
- Species: M. longirostris

Binomial name
- Morinia longirostris (Crosskey, 1977)

Synonyms
- Phyto longirostris Crosskey, 1977

Species of fly

Morinia longirostris is a species of cluster fly in the family Polleniidae.

== Distribution ==
South Africa.
