= Melanodexia glabricula =

Scientific classification
- Kingdom: Animalia
- Phylum: Arthropoda
- Class: Insecta
- Order: Diptera
- Family: Polleniidae
- Genus: Melanodexia
- Species: M. glabricula

Binomial name
- Melanodexia glabricula (Bigot, 1887)

Synonyms
- Nitellia glabricula Bigot, 1887

Species of fly

Melanodexia glabricula is a species of cluster fly in the family Polleniidae.

== Distribution ==
United States.
