= Pollenia grunini =

Scientific classification
- Kingdom: Animalia
- Phylum: Arthropoda
- Clade: Pancrustacea
- Class: Insecta
- Order: Diptera
- Family: Polleniidae
- Genus: Pollenia
- Species: P. grunini

Binomial name
- Pollenia grunini Rognes, 1988

Species of fly

Pollenia grunini is a species of cluster fly in the family Polleniidae.

== Distribution ==
Armenia, Georgia, Russia.
