= Cluster fly =

- Male Pollenia sp.

Scientific classification
- Kingdom: Animalia
- Phylum: Arthropoda
- Clade: Pancrustacea
- Class: Insecta
- Order: Diptera
- Subsection: Calyptratae
- Superfamily: Oestroidea
- Family: Polleniidae
- Genus: Pollenia; Robineau-Desvoidy, 1830

Type species
- Musca rudis Fabricius, 1794

Synonyms
- Nitellia Robineau-Desvoidy, 1830; Cephysa Robineau-Desvoidy, 1863; Orizia Robineau-Desvoidy, 1863; Sepimentum Hutton, 1901; Huttonophasia Curran, 1927; Chaetopollenia Enderlein, 1936; Micronitellia Enderlein, 1936; Trichopollenia Enderlein, 1936; Buresiella Jacentkovský, 1941; Bureschiella Jacentkovský, 1941 (Emend.); Chaetopollenia Jacentkovský, 1941 (Unav.); Dasypollenia Jacentkovský, 1941 (Unav.); Polleniella Jacentkovský, 1941 (Unav.); Polleniomyia Jacentkovský, 1941 (Unav.); Pseudopollenia Jacentkovský, 1941; Dasypollenia Jacentkovský, 1942 (Unav.); Polleniella Jacentkovsky, 1942; Polleniomyia Jacentkovský, 1942; Polleniomyma Jacentkovský, 1944; Eupollenia Lehrer, 1963; Jacentkovskyiomyia Lehrer, 1963; Mariomyia Lehrer, 1963; Parapollenia Lehrer, 1963; Rohdendorfiomyia Lehrer, 1963; Sachtlebeniola Lehrer, 1963 (Unav.); Seguyiomyia Lehrer, 1963; Zumptiomyia Lehrer, 1963; Dasypollenia Lehrer, 1967

Genus of flies

Cluster flies (a.k.a. grass flies or attic flies) are flies of the genus Pollenia in the family Polleniidae. Unlike the more familiar blow flies, such as the bluebottle genus Phormia they do not lay eggs in human food. They parasitise earthworms; the females lay their eggs near earthworm burrows, and the larvae then feed on the worms, but the biology of this group is relatively poorly known and a few have been recorded from other hosts including caterpillars and bees.

Cluster flies seek refuge in cold weather and find their way into attic spaces and similar areas indoors. They often emerge on warm days, and cluster at windows attempting to exit (hence the name).

Pollenia sp. on leaves in a forest

The typical grass fly Pollenia rudis is about 7 mm long and can be recognised by distinct lines or stripes behind the head, short golden-coloured hairs on the thorax, and irregular light and dark grey areas on the abdomen. Cluster flies are typically slow-moving.

Cluster flies have a widespread distribution. Eight species are found in Britain and 31 in Europe. Pollenia species are also numerous in Australia and New Zealand (over 30 species); they are common in North America. P. rudis has spread widely in association with humans.

== Species ==
- P. advena Dear, 1986
- P. aerosa Dear, 1986
- P. agneteae Rognes, 2019
- P. alajensis Rohdendorf, 1926
- P. amentaria (Scopoli, 1763)
- P. angustigena Wainwright, 1940
- P. antipodea Dear, 1986
- P. astrictifrons Dear, 1986
- P. atramentaria (Meigen, 1826)
- P. atricoma Dear, 1986
- P. atrifemur Malloch, 1930
- P. bartaki Rognes, 2016
- P. bezziana Rognes, 1992
- P. bicolor Robineau-Desvoidy, 1830
- P. bulgarica Jacentkovsky, 1939
- P. calamisessa Hardy, 1932
- P. chotei Kurahashi & Tumrasvin, 1979
- P. commensurata Dear, 1986
- P. consanguinea Dear, 1986
- P. consectata Dear, 1986
- P. contempta Robineau-Desvoidy, 1863
- P. cuprea Malloch, 1930
- P. dasypoda Portschinsky, 1881
- P. demissa (Hutton, 1901)
- P. dysaethria Dear, 1986
- P. dyscheres Dear, 1986
- P. dysethria Dear, 1986
- P. enetera Dear, 1986
- P. erlangshanna Feng, 2004
- P. eurybregma Dear, 1986
- P. flindersi Hardy, 1932
- P. fulviantenna Dear, 1986
- P. fulvipalpis Macquart 1835
- P. fumosa (Hutton, 1901)
- P. griseotomentosa (Jacentkovsky 1944)
- P. grunini Rognes, 1988
- P. haeretica Séguy, 1928
- P. hazarae (Senior-White, 1923)
- P. hirticeps Malloch, 1927
- P. hispida Dear, 1986
- P. huangshanensis Fan & Chen, 1997
- P. hungarica Rognes, 1987
- P. ibalia Séguy, 1930
- P. immanis Dear, 1986
- P. insularis Dear, 1986
- P. japonica Kano & Shinonaga, 1966
- P. labialis Robineau-Desvoidy 1863
- P. lativertex Dear, 1986
- P. leclercqiana (Lehrer 1978)
- P. limpida Dear, 1986
- P. luteovillosa Rognes 1987
- P. margarita Schluesslmayr & Sivell, 2021
- P. mayeri Jacentkovsky 1941
- P. mediterranea Grunin 1966
- P. mesopotamica Mawlood & Abdul-Rassoul, 2009
- P. moravica (Jacentkovský, 1941)
- P. moretonensis Macquart, 1855
- P. mystica Rognes, 1988
- P. nigripalpis Dear, 1986
- P. nigripes Malloch, 1930
- P. nigrisquama Malloch, 1930
- P. nigrita Malloch, 1936
- P. notialis Dear, 1986
- P. opalina Dear, 1986
- P. oreia Dear, 1986
- P. paragrunini Rognes, 1988
- P. paupera Rondani, 1862
- P. pectinata Grunin, 1966
- P. pediculata Macquart 1834
- P. pernix (Hutton, 1901)
- P. ponti Rognes, 1991
- P. primaeva Dear, 1986
- P. pseudintermedia Rognes, 1987
- P. pseudomelanurus (Feng, 2004)
- P. pulverea Dear, 1986
- P. rudis (Fabricius, 1794)
- P. ruficrura Rondani, 1862
- P. rufifemorata Rognes & Baz, 2008
- P. sakulasi (Kurahashi, 1987)
- P. sandaraca Dear, 1986
- P. scalena Dear, 1986
- P. semicinerea Villeneuve, 1911
- P. shaanxiensis Fan & Wu, 1997
- P. sichuanensis Feng, 2004
- P. similis (Jacentkovsky, 1941)
- P. stigi Rognes, 1992
- P. stolida Malloch, 1936
- P. tenuiforceps Séguy, 1928
- P. townsendi Senior-White, Aubertin & Smart, 1940
- P. umbrifera (Walker, 1861)
- P. uniseta Dear, 1986
- P. vagabunda (Meigen 1826)
- P. venturii Zumpt, 1956
- P. vera Jacentkovsky, 1936
- P. verneri Rognes, 1992
- P. viatica Robineau-Desvoidy, 1830
- P. viridiventris Macquart, 1847

== In popular culture ==
American rock band, Phish, references the common name of this species on their ninth studio album Farmhouse. The song, titled Farmhouse, was written by Trey Anastasio and Helena, Montana, born bassist and record producer Tony Markellis. The song's lyrics address the difficulty of managing the insects.
