= Morinia stuckenbergi =

Scientific classification
- Kingdom: Animalia
- Phylum: Arthropoda
- Class: Insecta
- Order: Diptera
- Family: Polleniidae
- Genus: Morinia
- Species: M. stuckenbergi

Binomial name
- Morinia stuckenbergi (Crosskey, 1977)

Synonyms
- Phyto stuckenbergi Crosskey, 1977

Species of fly

Morinia stuckenbergi is a species of cluster fly in the family Polleniidae.

== Distribution ==
South Africa.
