= Pollenia griseotomentosa =

Scientific classification
- Kingdom: Animalia
- Phylum: Arthropoda
- Class: Insecta
- Order: Diptera
- Family: Polleniidae
- Genus: Pollenia
- Species: P. griseotomentosa

Binomial name
- Pollenia griseotomentosa (Jacentkovský, 1944)

Synonyms
- Polleniella griseotomentosa Jacentkovský, 1944

Species of fly

Pollenia griseotomentosa is a species of cluster fly in the family Polleniidae.

== Distribution ==
Andorra, Austria, Belarus, Belgium, Czech Republic, Denmark, Finland, France, Germany, Great Britain, Hungary, Italy, Latvia, Netherlands, Poland, Russia, Slovakia, Spain, Sweden, Switzerland, Turkey, Ukraine. Introduced Canada.
