= Dexopollenia aurantifulva =

Scientific classification
- Kingdom: Animalia
- Phylum: Arthropoda
- Class: Insecta
- Order: Diptera
- Family: Polleniidae
- Genus: Dexopollenia
- Species: D. aurantifulva

Binomial name
- Dexopollenia aurantifulva Feng, 2004

Species of fly

Dexopollenia aurantifulva is a species of cluster fly in the family Polleniidae.

== Distribution ==
Noted to have been found at 1,760 m on Mt. Zhougong, in Ya'an (Sichuan, China)
