= Pollenia dasypoda =

Scientific classification
- Kingdom: Animalia
- Phylum: Arthropoda
- Class: Insecta
- Order: Diptera
- Family: Polleniidae
- Genus: Pollenia
- Species: P. dasypoda

Binomial name
- Pollenia dasypoda Portschinsky, 1881

Synonyms
- Dasypollenia landrocki Jacentkovský, 1941

Species of fly

Pollenia dasypoda is a species of cluster fly in the family Polleniidae.

== Distribution ==
India, Pakistan, Austria, Bulgaria, Czech Republic, Egypt, Georgia, Germany, Greece, Hungary, Iran, Israel, Italy, Kazakhstan, Lebanon, Moldova, Poland, Romania, Russia, Saudi Arabia, Slovakia, Syria, Tajikistan, Turkey, Ukraine, West Bank.
