= Pollenia contempta =

Scientific classification
- Kingdom: Animalia
- Phylum: Arthropoda
- Class: Insecta
- Order: Diptera
- Family: Polleniidae
- Genus: Pollenia
- Species: P. contempta

Binomial name
- Pollenia contempta Robineau-Desvoidy, 1863

Species of fly

Pollenia contempta is a species of cluster fly in the family Polleniidae.

== Distribution ==
France, Italy, Portugal, Spain, Tunisia.
