= Pollenia haeretica =

Scientific classification
- Kingdom: Animalia
- Phylum: Arthropoda
- Class: Insecta
- Order: Diptera
- Family: Polleniidae
- Genus: Pollenia
- Species: P. haeretica

Binomial name
- Pollenia haeretica Séguy, 1928

Species of fly

Pollenia haeretica is a species of cluster fly in the family Polleniidae.

== Distribution ==
Algeria, Tunisia, Italy.
