= Dexopollenia geniculata =

Scientific classification
- Kingdom: Animalia
- Phylum: Arthropoda
- Class: Insecta
- Order: Diptera
- Family: Polleniidae
- Genus: Dexopollenia
- Species: D. geniculata

Binomial name
- Dexopollenia geniculata Malloch, 1935

Species of fly

Dexopollenia geniculata is a species of cluster fly in the family Polleniidae.

== Distribution ==
Laos, China.
