= Pollenia leclercqiana =

Scientific classification
- Kingdom: Animalia
- Phylum: Arthropoda
- Class: Insecta
- Order: Diptera
- Family: Polleniidae
- Genus: Pollenia
- Species: P. leclercqiana

Binomial name
- Pollenia leclercqiana (Lehrer 1978)

Synonyms
- Nitellia leclercqiana Lehrer 1978

Species of fly

Pollenia leclercqiana is a species of cluster fly in the family Polleniidae.

== Distribution ==
France, Spain, Morocco.
