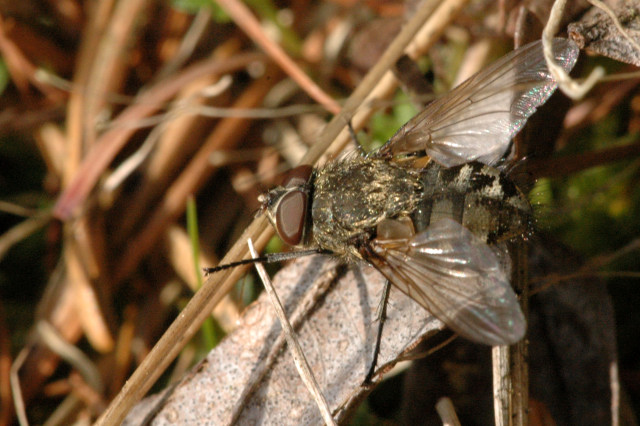

Scientific classification
- Kingdom: Animalia
- Phylum: Arthropoda
- Class: Insecta
- Order: Diptera
- Family: Polleniidae
- Genus: Pollenia
- Species: P. angustigena

Binomial name
- Pollenia angustigena Wainwright, 1940

= Pollenia angustigena =

Species of fly

Pollenia angustigena is a species of blow fly in the family Polleniidae.

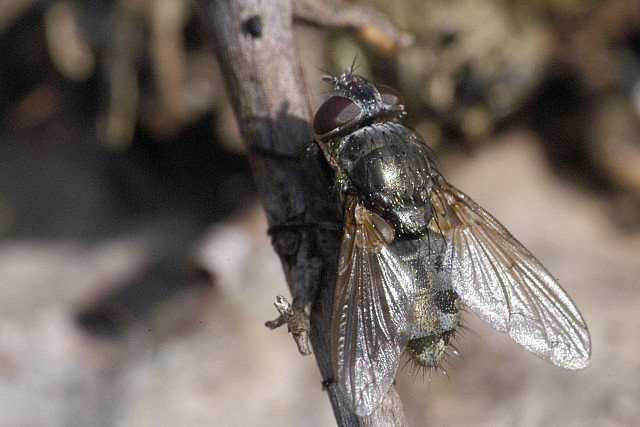
