= Pollenia umbrifera =

Scientific classification
- Kingdom: Animalia
- Phylum: Arthropoda
- Class: Insecta
- Order: Diptera
- Family: Polleniidae
- Genus: Pollenia
- Species: P. umbrifera

Binomial name
- Pollenia umbrifera (Walker, 1861)

Synonyms
- Musca umbrifera Walker, 1861

Species of fly

Pollenia umbrifera is a species of cluster fly in the family Polleniidae.

== Distribution ==
Indonesia.
