= Pollenia similis =

Scientific classification
- Kingdom: Animalia
- Phylum: Arthropoda
- Class: Insecta
- Order: Diptera
- Family: Polleniidae
- Genus: Pollenia
- Species: P. similis

Binomial name
- Pollenia similis (Jacentkovský, 1941)

Synonyms
- Dasypollenia similis Jacentkovský, 1941

Species of fly

Pollenia similis is a species of cluster fly in the family Polleniidae.

== Distribution ==
Austria, Albania, Czech Republic, Germany, Hungary, Poland, Romania, Slovakia, Ukraine.
