= Pollenia demissa =

Scientific classification
- Kingdom: Animalia
- Phylum: Arthropoda
- Class: Insecta
- Order: Diptera
- Family: Polleniidae
- Genus: Pollenia
- Species: P. demissa

Binomial name
- Pollenia demissa (Hutton, 1901)

Synonyms
- Sepimentum demissum Hutton, 1901; Pollenia minor Malloch, 1930

Species of fly

Pollenia demissa is a species of cluster fly in the family Polleniidae. It measures 6 mm (0.24 in) in length.

== Distribution ==
Pollenia demissa is endemic to New Zealand.
