= Pollenia fulvipalpis =

Scientific classification
- Kingdom: Animalia
- Phylum: Arthropoda
- Class: Insecta
- Order: Diptera
- Family: Polleniidae
- Genus: Pollenia
- Species: P. fulvipalpis

Binomial name
- Pollenia fulvipalpis Macquart 1835

Synonyms
- Pollenia bisulca Pandellé, 1896; Pollenia flavipalpis Rondani, 1862

Species of fly

Pollenia is a species of cluster fly in the family Polleniidae.

== Distribution ==
Channel Islands, France, Slovakia, Spain, Switzerland.
