= Dexopollenia bicoloripes =

Scientific classification
- Kingdom: Animalia
- Phylum: Arthropoda
- Class: Insecta
- Order: Diptera
- Family: Polleniidae
- Genus: Dexopollenia
- Species: D. bicoloripes

Binomial name
- Dexopollenia bicoloripes Malloch, 1931

Species of fly

Dexopollenia bicoloripes is a species of cluster fly in the family Polleniidae.

== Distribution ==
Malaysia.
