= Pollenia huangshanensis =

Scientific classification
- Kingdom: Animalia
- Phylum: Arthropoda
- Class: Insecta
- Order: Diptera
- Family: Polleniidae
- Genus: Pollenia
- Species: P. huangshanensis

Binomial name
- Pollenia huangshanensis Fan & Chen, 1997

Species of fly

Pollenia huangshanensis is a species of cluster fly in the family Polleniidae.

== Distribution ==
China.
