= Pollenia pseudintermedia =

Scientific classification
- Kingdom: Animalia
- Phylum: Arthropoda
- Class: Insecta
- Order: Diptera
- Family: Polleniidae
- Genus: Pollenia
- Species: P. pseudintermedia

Binomial name
- Pollenia pseudintermedia Rognes, 1987

Species of fly

Pollenia pseudintermedia is a species of cluster fly in the family Polleniidae.

== Distribution ==
Greece, Israel, Italy, Macedonia, Portugal, Spain.
