= Dexopollenia tianmushanensis =

Scientific classification
- Kingdom: Animalia
- Phylum: Arthropoda
- Class: Insecta
- Order: Diptera
- Family: Polleniidae
- Genus: Dexopollenia
- Species: D. tianmushanensis

Binomial name
- Dexopollenia tianmushanensis Fan, 1997

Species of fly

Dexopollenia tianmushanensis is a species of cluster fly in the family Polleniidae.

== Distribution ==
China.
