= Pollenia tenuiforceps =

Scientific classification
- Kingdom: Animalia
- Phylum: Arthropoda
- Class: Insecta
- Order: Diptera
- Family: Polleniidae
- Genus: Pollenia
- Species: P. tenuiforceps

Binomial name
- Pollenia tenuiforceps Séguy, 1928

Synonyms
- Dasypoda angustifrons Jacentkovský, 1941

Species of fly

Pollenia tenuiforceps is a species of cluster fly in the family Polleniidae.

== Distribution ==
Algeria, Bosnia and Herzegovina, Czech Republic, France, Hungary, Romania, Slovakia, Slovenia, Switzerland, Ukraine.
