= Morinia royi =

Scientific classification
- Kingdom: Animalia
- Phylum: Arthropoda
- Class: Insecta
- Order: Diptera
- Family: Polleniidae
- Genus: Morinia
- Species: M. royi

Binomial name
- Morinia royi (Pape, 1987)

Synonyms
- Phyto royi Pape, 1987

Species of fly

Morinia royi is a species of cluster fly in the family Polleniidae.

== Distribution ==
South Africa.
