= Dexopollenia nigriscens =

Scientific classification
- Kingdom: Animalia
- Phylum: Arthropoda
- Class: Insecta
- Order: Diptera
- Family: Polleniidae
- Genus: Dexopollenia
- Species: D. nigriscens

Binomial name
- Dexopollenia nigriscens Fan, 1992

Species of fly

Dexopollenia nigriscens is a species of cluster fly in the family Polleniidae.

== Distribution ==
Nepal, China.
