= Anthracomyza atratula =

Scientific classification
- Kingdom: Animalia
- Phylum: Arthropoda
- Clade: Pancrustacea
- Class: Insecta
- Order: Diptera
- Family: Polleniidae
- Genus: Anthracomyza
- Species: A. atratula

Binomial name
- Anthracomyza atratula (Malloch, 1927)

Synonyms
- Anthracomyia atratula Malloch, 1927

Species of fly

Anthracomyza atratula is a species of cluster fly in the family Polleniidae.

== Distribution ==
Australia.
