= Pollenia moretonensis =

Scientific classification
- Kingdom: Animalia
- Phylum: Arthropoda
- Clade: Pancrustacea
- Class: Insecta
- Order: Diptera
- Family: Polleniidae
- Genus: Pollenia
- Species: P. moretonensis

Binomial name
- Pollenia moretonensis Macquart, 1855

Species of fly

Pollenia moretonensis is a species of cluster fly in the family Polleniidae.

== Distribution ==
Australia.
