= Pollenia fumosa =

Scientific classification
- Kingdom: Animalia
- Phylum: Arthropoda
- Class: Insecta
- Order: Diptera
- Family: Polleniidae
- Genus: Pollenia
- Species: P. fumosa

Binomial name
- Pollenia fumosa (Hutton, 1901)

Synonyms
- Sepimentum fumosum Hutton, 1901

Species of fly

Pollenia fumosa is a species of cluster fly in the family Polleniidae. It measures 7–8 mm (0.28–0.31 in) in length.

== Distribution ==
Pollenia fumosa is endemic to New Zealand.
