= Pollenia mayeri =

Scientific classification
- Kingdom: Animalia
- Phylum: Arthropoda
- Class: Insecta
- Order: Diptera
- Family: Polleniidae
- Genus: Pollenia
- Species: P. mayeri

Binomial name
- Pollenia mayeri Jacentkovský, 1941

Synonyms
- Polleniella distincta Jacentkovský, 1941

Species of fly

Pollenia mayeri is a species of cluster fly in the family Polleniidae.

== Distribution ==
Belarus, Czech Republic, Germany, Hungary, Netherlands, Poland, Romania, Slovakia, Ukraine.
