= Pollenia bulgarica =

Scientific classification
- Kingdom: Animalia
- Phylum: Arthropoda
- Class: Insecta
- Order: Diptera
- Family: Polleniidae
- Genus: Pollenia
- Species: P. bulgarica

Binomial name
- Pollenia bulgarica Jacentkovsky 1939

Species of fly

Pollenia bulgarica is a species of cluster fly in the family Polleniidae.

== Distribution ==
Armenia, Azerbaijan, Bulgaria, Greece, Hungary, Iran, Moldova, Poland, Romania, Slovakia, Turkey, Ukraine.
