= Xanthotryxus auratus =

Scientific classification
- Kingdom: Animalia
- Phylum: Arthropoda
- Clade: Pancrustacea
- Class: Insecta
- Order: Diptera
- Family: Polleniidae
- Genus: Xanthotryxus
- Species: X. auratus

Binomial name
- Xanthotryxus auratus (Séguy, 1934)

Synonyms
- Pollenia aurata Séguy, 1934

Species of fly

Xanthotryxus auratus is a species of cluster fly in the family Polleniidae.

== Distribution ==
China.
