= Pollenia margarita =

Scientific classification
- Kingdom: Animalia
- Phylum: Arthropoda
- Class: Insecta
- Order: Diptera
- Family: Polleniidae
- Genus: Pollenia
- Species: P. margarita

Binomial name
- Pollenia margarita Schluesslmayr & Sivell 2021

Species of fly

Pollenia margarita is a species of cluster fly in the family Polleniidae.

== Distribution ==
P. margarita is distributed around Austria.
