= Pollenia sichuanensis =

Scientific classification
- Kingdom: Animalia
- Phylum: Arthropoda
- Clade: Pancrustacea
- Class: Insecta
- Order: Diptera
- Family: Polleniidae
- Genus: Pollenia
- Species: P. sichuanensis

Binomial name
- Pollenia sichuanensis Feng, 2004

Species of fly

Pollenia sichuanensis is a species of cluster fly in the family Polleniidae.
