= Pollenia labialis =

Scientific classification
- Kingdom: Animalia
- Phylum: Arthropoda
- Class: Insecta
- Order: Diptera
- Family: Polleniidae
- Genus: Pollenia
- Species: P. labialis

Binomial name
- Pollenia labialis Robineau-Desvoidy, 1863

Synonyms
- Pollenia excarinata Wainwright, 1940

Species of fly

Pollenia labialis is a species of cluster fly in the family Polleniidae.

== Distribution ==
Andorra, Austria, Belgium, Bosnia and Herzegovina, Czech Republic, Denmark, Finland, France, Germany, Great Britain, Greece, Hungary, Ireland, Italy, Latvia, Lithuania, Netherlands, Norway, Poland, Portugal, Romania, Russia, Slovakia, Spain, Sweden, Switzerland, Turkey, Ukraine. Introduced to Canada, United States, China.
