= Pollenia paupera =

Scientific classification
- Kingdom: Animalia
- Phylum: Arthropoda
- Class: Insecta
- Order: Diptera
- Family: Polleniidae
- Genus: Pollenia
- Species: P. paupera

Binomial name
- Pollenia paupera Rondani 1862

Synonyms
- Pollenia longitheca Rognes, 1987

Species of fly

Pollenia paupera is a species of cluster fly in the family Polleniidae.

== Distribution ==
Algeria, Cyprus, France, Greece, Iran, Israel, Italy, Malta, Turkey, Ukraine.
