= Morinia nigerrima =

Scientific classification
- Kingdom: Animalia
- Phylum: Arthropoda
- Class: Insecta
- Order: Diptera
- Family: Polleniidae
- Genus: Morinia
- Species: M. nigerrima

Binomial name
- Morinia nigerrima (Herting, 1961)

Synonyms
- Anthracomyia nigerrima Herting, 1961; Anthromyia nigrerrima Sidhu, Gupta & Singh, 2018

Species of fly

Morinia nigerrima is a species of cluster fly in the family Polleniidae.

== Distribution ==
Japan.
