= Morinia argenticincta =

Scientific classification
- Kingdom: Animalia
- Phylum: Arthropoda
- Class: Insecta
- Order: Diptera
- Family: Polleniidae
- Genus: Morinia
- Species: M. argenticincta

Binomial name
- Morinia argenticincta (Senior-White, 1923)

Synonyms
- Idiopsis argenticincta Senior-White, 1923

Species of fly

Morinia argenticincta is a species of cluster fly in the family Polleniidae.

== Distribution ==
India, Nepal, Japan.
