= Pollenia viatica =

Scientific classification
- Kingdom: Animalia
- Phylum: Arthropoda
- Class: Insecta
- Order: Diptera
- Family: Polleniidae
- Genus: Pollenia
- Species: P. viatica

Binomial name
- Pollenia viatica Robineau-Desvoidy, 1830

Synonyms
- Pollenia fulvicornis Robineau-Desvoidy, 1830; Pollenia vivida Robineau-Desvoidy, 1830; Pollenia pallida Rohdendorf, 1926; Pollenia luciensis Mercier, 1930; Pollenia carinata Wainwright, 1940

Species of fly

Pollenia viatica is a species of cluster fly in the family Polleniidae.

== Distribution ==
Armenia, Belgium, Bulgaria, Croatia, Czech Republic, Denmark, France, Germany, Great Britain, Greece, Hungary, Iran, Israel, Italy, Jordan, Kazakhstan, Kyrgyzstan, Lebanon, Malta, Moldova, Netherlands, Poland, Romania, Slovakia, Sweden, Syria, Turkey, Ukraine, Uzbekistan, West Bank, Yugoslavia.
