= Pollenia rufifemorata =

Scientific classification
- Kingdom: Animalia
- Phylum: Arthropoda
- Class: Insecta
- Order: Diptera
- Family: Polleniidae
- Genus: Pollenia
- Species: P. rufifemorata

Binomial name
- Pollenia rufifemorata Rognes & Baz, 2008

Species of fly

Pollenia rufifemorata is a species of cluster fly in the family Polleniidae.

== Distribution ==
Spain.
