= Dexopollenia uniseta =

Scientific classification
- Kingdom: Animalia
- Phylum: Arthropoda
- Class: Insecta
- Order: Diptera
- Family: Polleniidae
- Genus: Dexopollenia
- Species: D. uniseta

Binomial name
- Dexopollenia uniseta Fan, 1992

Synonyms
- Dexopollenia wyatti Kurahashi, 1992

Species of fly

Dexopollenia uniseta is a species of cluster fly in the family Polleniidae.

== Distribution ==
Malaysia, China.
