= Pollenia chotei =

Scientific classification
- Kingdom: Animalia
- Phylum: Arthropoda
- Class: Insecta
- Order: Diptera
- Family: Polleniidae
- Genus: Pollenia
- Species: P. chotei

Binomial name
- Pollenia chotei Kurahashi & Tumrasvin, 1979

Species of fly

Pollenia chotei is a species of cluster fly in the family Polleniidae.

== Distribution ==
Thailand.
