= Dexopollenia bicolor =

Scientific classification
- Kingdom: Animalia
- Phylum: Arthropoda
- Class: Insecta
- Order: Diptera
- Family: Polleniidae
- Genus: Dexopollenia
- Species: D. bicolor

Binomial name
- Dexopollenia bicolor Malloch, 1935

Synonyms
- Pollenia mallochi Blackith, 1991

Species of fly

Dexopollenia bicolor is a species of cluster fly in the family Polleniidae.

== Distribution ==
Malaysia, Thailand.
