= Pollenia pseudomelanurus =

Scientific classification
- Kingdom: Animalia
- Phylum: Arthropoda
- Class: Insecta
- Order: Diptera
- Family: Polleniidae
- Genus: Pollenia
- Species: P. pseudomelanurus

Binomial name
- Pollenia pseudomelanurus Feng, 2004

Species of fly

Pollenia pseudomelanurus is a species of cluster fly in the family Polleniidae.

== Distribution ==
China.
