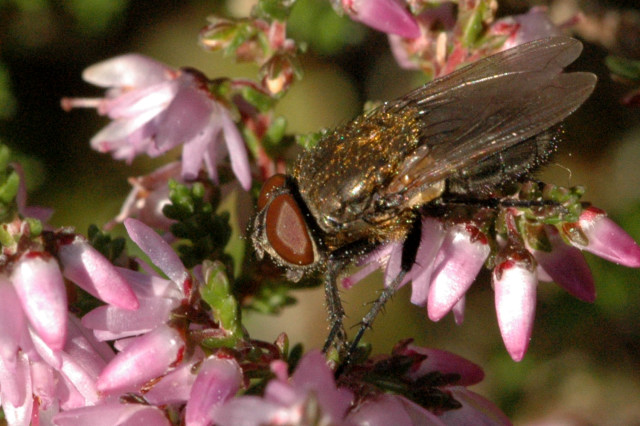

Scientific classification
- Kingdom: Animalia
- Phylum: Arthropoda
- Class: Insecta
- Order: Diptera
- Family: Polleniidae
- Genus: Pollenia
- Species: P. amentaria

Binomial name
- Pollenia amentaria (Scopoli, 1763)

Synonyms
- Musca amentaria Scopoli, 1763; Pollenia micans Robineau-Desvoidy, 1830; Musca nigrina Meigen, 1838; Musca nitens Zetterstedt, 1845; Chaetopollenia soudeki Jacentkovský, 1941

= Pollenia amentaria =

Species of fly

Pollenia amentaria is a species of cluster fly in the family Polleniidae.

== Distribution ==
Albania, Andorra, Armenia, Austria, Belgium, Bulgaria, China, Croatia, Czech Republic, Denmark, Finland, France, Germany, Great Britain, Greece, Hungary, Iran, Ireland, Italy, Macedonia, Morocco, Netherlands, Norway, Poland, Romania, Russia, Slovakia, Slovenia, Spain, Sweden, Switzerland, Ukraine, Yugoslavia.
