= Pollenia atricoma =

Conservation status
- Naturally Uncommon (NZ TCS)

Scientific classification
- Kingdom: Animalia
- Phylum: Arthropoda
- Clade: Pancrustacea
- Class: Insecta
- Order: Diptera
- Family: Polleniidae
- Genus: Pollenia
- Species: P. atricoma

Binomial name
- Pollenia atricoma Dear, 1986

Species of fly

Pollenia atricoma is a species of cluster fly in the family Polleniidae.

== Distribution ==
They are found in New Zealand.

== Conservation status ==
Under the New Zealand Threat Classification System this species is listed as "Naturally Uncommon" with the qualifier of "Sparse".
