= Pollenia primaeva =

Scientific classification
- Kingdom: Animalia
- Phylum: Arthropoda
- Clade: Pancrustacea
- Class: Insecta
- Order: Diptera
- Family: Polleniidae
- Genus: Pollenia
- Species: P. primaeva

Binomial name
- Pollenia primaeva Dear, 1986

Species of fly

Pollenia primaeva is a species of cluster fly in the family Polleniidae.

== Distribution ==
New Zealand.
