= Dexopollenia hirtiventris =

Scientific classification
- Kingdom: Animalia
- Phylum: Arthropoda
- Class: Insecta
- Order: Diptera
- Family: Polleniidae
- Genus: Dexopollenia
- Species: D. hirtiventris

Binomial name
- Dexopollenia hirtiventris Malloch, 1935

Species of fly

Dexopollenia hirtiventris is a species of cluster fly in the family Polleniidae.

== Distribution ==
Malaysia.
