= Dexopollenia disemura =

Scientific classification
- Kingdom: Animalia
- Phylum: Arthropoda
- Class: Insecta
- Order: Diptera
- Family: Polleniidae
- Genus: Dexopollenia
- Species: D. disemura

Binomial name
- Dexopollenia disemura Fan & Deng, 1993

Species of fly

Dexopollenia disemura is a species of cluster fly in the family Polleniidae.

== Distribution ==
China.
