= Dexopollenia trifascia =

Scientific classification
- Kingdom: Animalia
- Phylum: Arthropoda
- Class: Insecta
- Order: Diptera
- Family: Polleniidae
- Genus: Dexopollenia
- Species: D. trifascia

Binomial name
- Dexopollenia trifascia (Walker, 1861)

Synonyms
- Musca trifascia Walker, 1861

Species of fly

Dexopollenia trifascia is a species of cluster fly in the family Polleniidae.

== Distribution ==
Indonesia.
