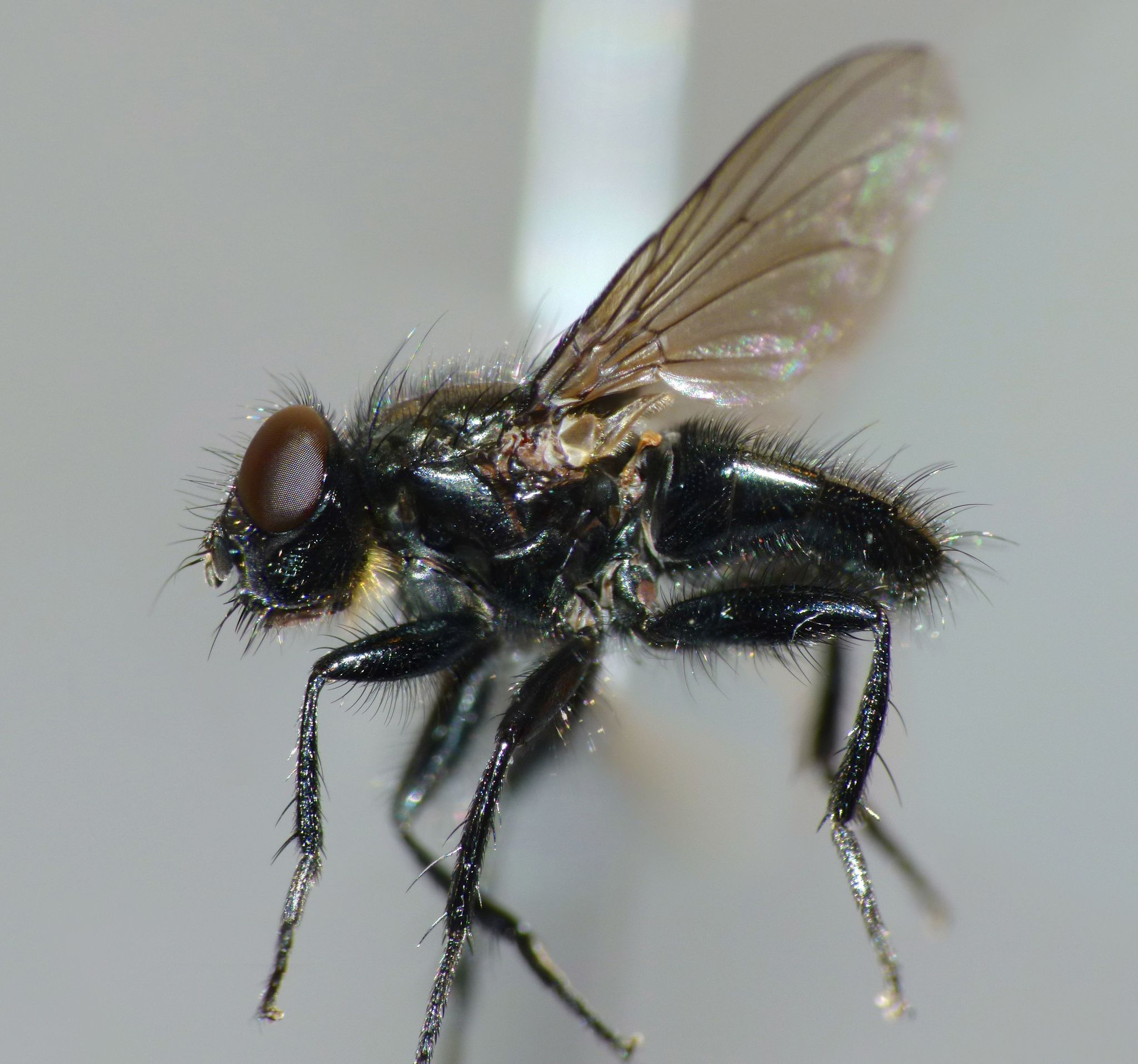
- Pollenia pernix seen on Ulva Island

Scientific classification
- Kingdom: Animalia
- Phylum: Arthropoda
- Class: Insecta
- Order: Diptera
- Family: Polleniidae
- Genus: Pollenia
- Species: P. pernix

Binomial name
- Pollenia pernix (Hutton, 1901)

Synonyms
- Gymnophania pernix Hutton, 1901

= Pollenia pernix =

Species of fly

Pollenia pernix is a species of cluster fly in the family Polleniidae. It measures 7 mm (0.28 in) in length.

== Distribution ==
Pollenia pernix is endemic to New Zealand.
