= Pollenia stigi =

Scientific classification
- Kingdom: Animalia
- Phylum: Arthropoda
- Clade: Pancrustacea
- Class: Insecta
- Order: Diptera
- Family: Polleniidae
- Genus: Pollenia
- Species: P. stigi

Binomial name
- Pollenia stigi Rognes 1992

Species of fly

Pollenia stigi is a species of cluster fly in the family Polleniidae.

== Distribution ==
They are known to be found in Morocco.
