= Dexopollenia flava =

Scientific classification
- Kingdom: Animalia
- Phylum: Arthropoda
- Class: Insecta
- Order: Diptera
- Family: Polleniidae
- Genus: Dexopollenia
- Species: D. flava

Binomial name
- Dexopollenia flava (Aldrich, 1930)

Synonyms
- Lispoparea flava Aldrich, 1930

Species of fly

Dexopollenia flava is a species of cluster fly in the family Polleniidae.

== Distribution ==
India, Taiwan, Japan, China.
