= Pollenia alajensis =

Scientific classification
- Kingdom: Animalia
- Phylum: Arthropoda
- Class: Insecta
- Order: Diptera
- Family: Polleniidae
- Genus: Pollenia
- Species: P. alajensis

Binomial name
- Pollenia alajensis Rohdendorf, 1926

Synonyms
- Pollenia sytshevskajae Grunin, 1970; Pollenia sytshevskiae Schumann, 1986

Species of fly

Pollenia alajensis is a species of cluster fly in the family Polleniidae.

== Distribution ==
Kyrgyzstan.
