= Melanodexia idahoensis =

Scientific classification
- Kingdom: Animalia
- Phylum: Arthropoda
- Class: Insecta
- Order: Diptera
- Family: Polleniidae
- Genus: Melanodexia
- Species: M. idahoensis

Binomial name
- Melanodexia idahoensis Hall, 1948

Species of fly

Melanodexia idahoensis is a species of cluster fly in the family Polleniidae.

== Distribution ==
United States.
