= Morinia =

Scientific classification
- Kingdom: Animalia
- Phylum: Arthropoda
- Clade: Pancrustacea
- Class: Insecta
- Order: Diptera
- Superfamily: Oestroidea
- Family: Polleniidae
- Genus: Morinia; Robineau-Desvoidy, 1830

Type species
- Morinia velox Robineau-Desvoidy, 1830

Synonyms
- Calobatemyia Macquart, 1855; Anthracomya Rondani, 1856; Morjnia Rondani, 1862; Antracomya Lioy, 1864; Anthracomyia Rondani, 1868; Disticheria Enderlein, 1934; Anthromyia Sidhu, Gupta & Singh, 2018

Genus of insects

Morinia is a genus of flies in the family Polleniidae.

== Species ==
- Morinia argenticincta (Senior-White, 1923)
- Morinia carinata (Pape, 1987)
- Morinia doronici (Scopoli, 1763)
- Morinia crassitarsis (Villeneuve, 1936)
- Morinia lactineala (Pape, 1997)
- Morinia longirostris (Crosskey, 1977)
- Morinia nigerrima (Herting, 1961)
- Morinia piliparafacia Fan, 1997
- Morinia proceripenisa Feng, 2004
- Morinia royi (Pape, 1997)
- Morinia skufyini Khitsova, 1983
- Morinia stuckenbergi (Crosskey, 1977)
- Morinia tsitsikamma Cerretti, Stireman, Badano, Gisondi, Rognes, Lo Giudice & Pape, 2019
