= Dexopollenia sakulasi =

Scientific classification
- Kingdom: Animalia
- Phylum: Arthropoda
- Class: Insecta
- Order: Diptera
- Family: Polleniidae
- Genus: Dexopollenia
- Species: D. sakulasi

Binomial name
- Dexopollenia sakulasi Kurahashi, 1987

Species of fly

Dexopollenia sakulasi is a species of cluster fly in the family Polleniidae.

== Distribution ==
Papua New Guinea.
