= Core Magazine =

Japanese publishing company

- Type: Kabushiki gaisha
- Founded: 1985
- Headquarters: Tokyo, Japan
- Area served: Japan
- Key people: Shinichi Nakazawa (CEO)
- Products: Magazines, manga, light novels
- Revenue: 5.9 billion yen (as of 2008)
- Owner: Byakuya-Shobo Co., Ltd.
- Number of employees: 134 (as of April 1, 2010)
- Website: www.cmz.jp

Core Magazine Co. Ltd. (株式会社コアマガジン) is a Japanese publishing company focused on adult material, such as adult magazines and hentai manga. It also publishes yaoi titles, such as Kirepapa. The company was established in 1985 as Shōnen Shuppansha (株式会社少年出版社) by Byakuya Shobo.

Core Magazine owns a bookstore chain "Core Books" (コアブックス).

== History ==
In July 2002, a special issue of Bubka magazine featured unauthorized childhood photos of several female idols, including Norika Fujiwara, Kyoko Fukada, and Natsumi Abe. A suit was started against Core Magazine for privacy violation.

In 2009, it was the top ero-manga publisher in Japan, with 76 titles, beating Akane Shinsha, which only had 65.

In July 2013, the head editor, Akira Ota, and the two staff members were arrested for having their manga shown partially uncensored. They pled guilty in December 2013 and apologized for their irresponsibility.

In September 2017, Komiflo announced in collaboration with Core Magazine that its titles would be available for streaming. Starting with Hotmilk, this expanded to include MegaStore in 2018.

== Magazines published ==
- Comic Zero EX (コミック0EX), a monthly magazine, which replaced Comic Mega Plus (コミックメガプラス) in 2007.
- Comic Hotmilk (コミックホットミルク)
- Comic Mega GOLD (コミックメガGOLD), bakunyū manga magazine
- Comic MegaMilk (コミック メガミルク), a monthly magazine, which replaced Comic Zero EX (コミック0EX) in 2010
- Comic MegaStore (コミックメガストア)
- drap, yaoi magazine
- Comic Nyan2 Club GOLD (コミックニャン2倶楽部GOLD)
- Gekiga Madmax (劇画ﾏｯﾄﾞﾏｯｸｽ)
- Manga Bangaichi (漫画ばんがいち)

Video games (eroge) magazines

- MegaStore (メガストア)
- G-type
- Voice-type

Tabloid magazines

- Jitsuwa Bunka Taboo (実話BUNKAタブー); originally a spin-off magazine of Bubka.

Formerly published

- Bubka (ブブカ); publishing transferred to parent company Byakuya Shobo in September 2012, switched format from being a shukanshi to an idol-focused magazine following the change of publisher.
- Game Urara (ゲームウララ); a short-lived underground, general video game magazine, known for its advertisements for, and coverage of, Hong Kong 97 and game backup devices.

== See also ==
- La Satanica—Japanese manga anthology
