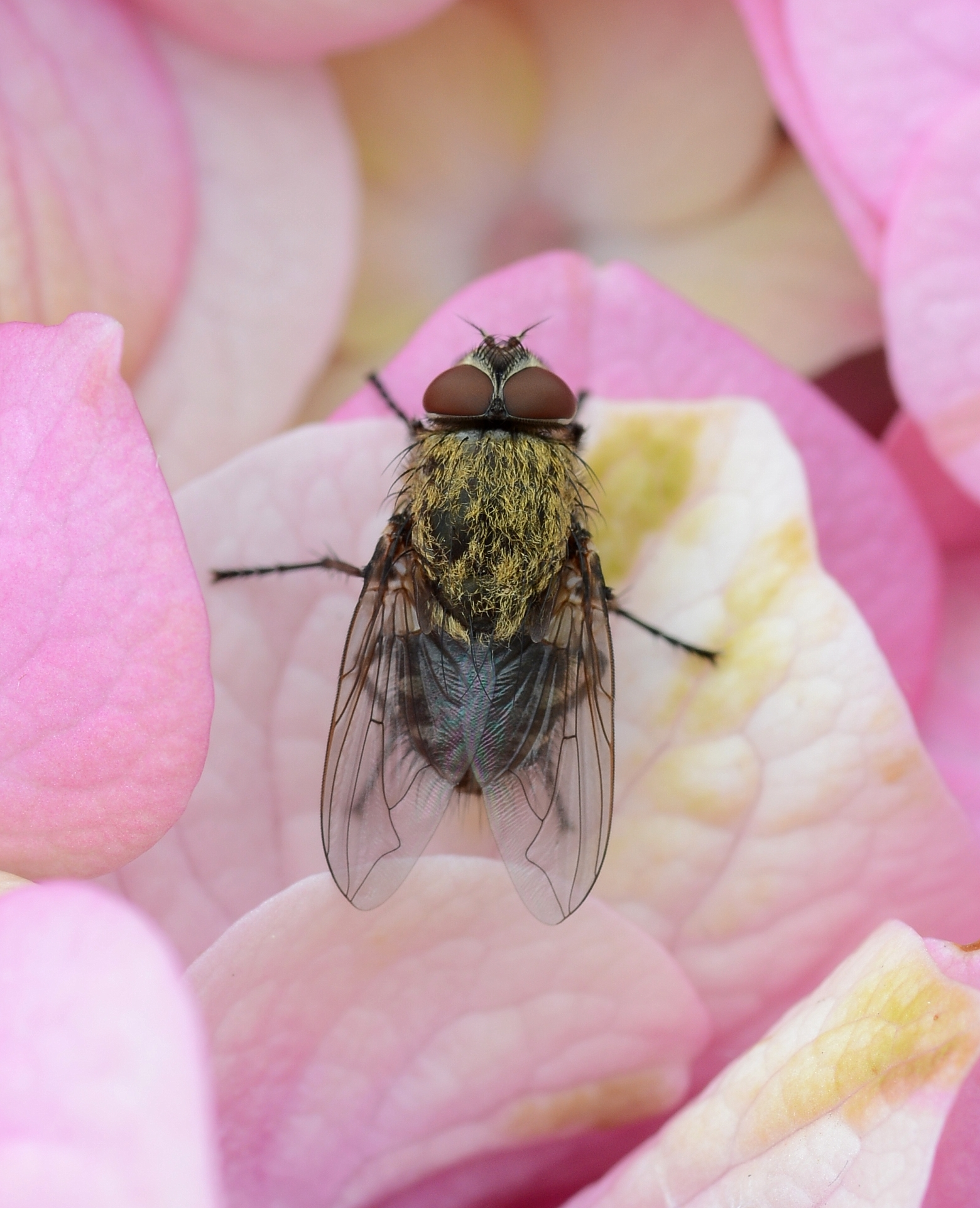

Scientific classification
- Kingdom: Animalia
- Phylum: Arthropoda
- Clade: Pancrustacea
- Class: Insecta
- Order: Diptera
- Superfamily: Oestroidea
- Family: Polleniidae
- Genus: Pollenia
- Species: P. rudis

Binomial name
- Pollenia rudis (Fabricius, 1794)

Synonyms
- Musca familiaris Harris, 1869; Musca rudis Fabricius, 1794

= Pollenia rudis =

Species of fly

Pollenia rudis, the common cluster fly, is a species of fly in the family Polleniidae. Pollenia rudis is also known as the attic fly, the loft fly, pollenie du lombric [French], and the buckwheat fly. During the autumn and winter months, Pollenia rudis can be found overwintering inside attics or lofts. This sluggish species can be found “clustering” near the interior windows of a warm structure.

This species is widely distributed throughout the United States, Canada, and Europe and is considered a pest species in structures. P. rudis can be found wherever their host earthworm, the Allolobophora genera (also known by the genus name: Aporrectodea), occurs. These earthworms are typically located in well-drained, silt-loam soil with grass cover. During the summer, P. rudis can be found in fields and open areas. It is only when there is a sudden drop in temperature that the cluster fly shifts to the interior of structures, holes in trees, loose bark, or other crevices and cavities.

== History ==
The common name "cluster fly" was derived from the clustering behavior in adults of this species in attics and lofts. The common name, "buckwheat fly", is derived from the odor of buckwheat honey the species gives off when they are crushed. Pollenia rudis was first documented by Johan Christian Fabricius in 1794. At the time, Fabricius listed the genera and species as Musca rudis. This taxonomy was changed in 1830 by André Jean Baptiste Robineau-Desvoidy to Pollenia rudis. The change of genus to Pollenia (suggested by the pollen of flowers) occurred for Muscids having, among other features, the thorax covered with "down-like clothing". P. rudis has also been previously described under the name of Musca familiaris in 1869 by Dr. T.W. Harris.

The cluster fly is a European species and it is unclear when it arrived in the United States. This species gained particular attention in the United States when Dr. W. H. Dall, of the Smithsonian Institution, published an article in the Proceedings of the U.S. National Museum for 1882. Dr. Dall secured specimens of P. rudis for identification. He also documented the species's appearance in Geneva, New York 30 years prior to his publication. P. rudis may have been introduced to the United States upon slow sailing vessels in the cooler months of the year that traveled from Europe. This is possible due to the hibernation behaviors of the adult cluster flies to seek shelter for overwintering. The species also could have been transported to North America in the ballast of ships containing soil and the cluster fly host, earthworms.

== Characteristics ==
=== Distinctive markings ===
All flies can be identified from other species by certain characteristics. They can differ in thoracic coloring, basicosta coloring, and spiracle coloring. Size and shape are aids in identification. Pollenia rudis eggs are oblong-shaped. They are very small and white. The P. rudis larvae are white with posterior spiracles. The adult Pollenia rudis looks like most of the other Pollenia species such as pallida, and dasylpoda. They are dark gray with checkered black and silvery-black abdomens. A newly emerged fly has many golden hairs on its thorax which may be lost throughout the life of the fly. The stripes on the thorax are not as prominent as on the house fly and the tips of the wings overlap when at rest. The cluster fly is slightly larger than a house fly at 9.525-12.7mm (3/8-1/2 inch) long. The similarities between pallida and rudis are seen in the female specimens. P. pallida has a broad, flattened facial keel. P.dasyloda has a black head with yellow tint on the frons. The basicosta can be found in many colors ranging from yellow to light brown. Some specimens have black basicosta. The posterior spiracle ranges from yellow in color to light brown. The number of bristles and setae found on this species are characteristic of this species only. There are 2-3 rows of setae located on the thoracic section and 6-8 strong frontal bristles (bristles are thick setae). They also have aristate antennae.

=== Behavior ===
The behavior of the P. rudis fly varies with the annual seasons and conditions of the day. During the summer, on a sunny day these flies can be found without much trouble. When it is cold these flies tend to find somewhere warm and dry. They are mainly found in forest or wooded areas during the cold season. The flies tend to frequent dry areas because of their aristae antennae. The aristae are sensitive to minute temperature and pressure changes. During the winter, adult P. rudis' have a habit of overwintering. This ritual begins when the weather starts to get cold. The flies will inhabit the old tunnels created by past insects. They can also be found in old bird nests, under the bark of trees, or in homes. P. rudis will overwinter until spring, living off of its own fat.

=== Food sources ===
Earthworms are a major source of food for Pollenia rudis. The main species of earthworm that these cluster flies infect are Aporrectoda caliginosa, Aporrectoda chlorotica, Eisenia lucens, Lumbricus rubellus, and Lumbricus terrestris. Immediately after the larvae hatch, they begin looking for worms. The first instar larvae eat their way through the integument section of the earthworm’s epidermis. While feeding, the P. rudis larvae leave the spiracles outside of the earthworm. Inside the earthworm, the larvae feed until they are ready to pupate. The adult P. rudis are, in most cases, herbivores. They feed on many types of organic matter. Plant sap, fruit, flowers and feces are common energy pathways for P. rudis. P. rudis is also attracted to malt extract, acetyl acetate and the proteins in animal meat.

=== Predators ===
Entomophthora muscae or Entomophthora schizophorae is a fungus that commonly infects adult flies. This fungus causes disease within the fly resulting in a swollen abdomen. This swollen abdomen makes the wings and legs spread apart, ultimately causing the fly to have trouble flying. After some time with this disease, a P. rudis adult will lose the ability to fly. Without flight, this fly has no way of protecting itself from predators. The main predator of P. rudis larvae is the sphecid wasps. These wasps will sting the fly and inject some poison. Once the fly has died, the wasp will feed the fly to their young. There are also other generalist predators of this fly, such as ants, birds, and certain plants.

== Life cycle ==
=== Europe ===
There are very specific differences between the life cycle of Pollenia rudis in Europe and North America. In Europe, it takes 10–12 months for an egg to fully develop into an adult, resulting in one generation per year. P. rudis adults of European origin copulate in the autumn, leaving their first instar larvae in a dormant state in the bodies of earthworms over the winter. The larvae will then molt twice over approximately 20 days and then pupate outside of the host. Usually, the pupal stage lasts from 32–45 days, but at high temperatures (e.g. 27°C) the pupal stage can be as short as 7 days.

=== North America ===
In North America, P. rudis eggs generally require 27–39 days to fully develop into an adult. In Canada, 25–30 days are required when the temperature is 23°C, and 11-14 of these days are spent in the pupal stage. Cluster flies in North America overwinter in their adult stage, and copulation takes place in the spring. There are three species in the rudis species complex of North America, and the life cycle of each species may differ. The variety of species in North America may account for the discrepancies between European and North American cluster flies life cycles.

Female cluster flies preferentially oviposit eggs in humid areas with dense surface vegetation and high soil moisture. Each egg is either deposited by itself or in a small cluster of about seven eggs. In total, a female cluster fly will lay an average of 100-130 eggs by ovipositing a small group, then crawling or flying some distance before ovipositing each subsequent group of eggs. Once the larvae hatch, they burrow into the soil by following natural pore spaces, such as holes near plant stems or paths that earthworms have already created. By randomly moving through these pores, P. rudis larvae find their host worms. A larva is prompted to penetrate an earthworm when it senses “penetration inducing factor,” a substance that is present in the slime and coelomic fluid of an earthworm. The larvae then use their mandibles to penetrate the dorsal side of a worm. It is important that they find their host quickly, because larvae must penetrate a worm within three days in order to survive.

More than one larva can penetrate a single earthworm, and two or more larvae can share a penetration site. Once the host worm begins to decompose and is no longer useful to the larvae, the larvae can either leave to find another host or move to a less decomposed section further down on its host worm. If a first instar larva decides to move to another host, it must penetrate its new host quickly in order to survive. Towards the end of the first instar stage and into the second and third instar stages, the larvae are able to survive longer separations from their hosts. Usually, the first and second instars act as internal parasites while the third instar can parasitize the host and feed on the surface of the host. Currently there are no reports of P. rudis reducing earthworm populations or causing horticultural problems.

==== Overwintering ====
Adult cluster flies in North America are slow-flying insects that are active during warmer months. Once the weather becomes much cooler, P. rudis will seek shelter, usually in homes and buildings. The flies have also been documented staying in tunnels made by beetles in timber and in animal burrows. Before overwintering, cluster fly’s abdomens are full of fat globules that may be left over from its larval fat bodies. When spring begins and the flies emerge, they appear shrunken because their fat was used up during the winter.

== Human importance ==
=== Pest status ===
Pollenia rudis is most commonly known for being a household nuisance. The first reports of cluster flies as pests in homes occurred as early as the nineteenth century, and these flies continue to cause problems today. Cluster flies tend to enter homes and buildings in large masses in late summer or early autumn to seek shelter for the winter months. They possess the ability to squeeze their bodies through any exterior crevices of a home, such as cracks around windows and doors, air conditioning vents, screening vents, and loosely hung siding. Once cluster flies enter a home, they usually hibernate in inaccessible areas between walls and in ceilings until spring when they emerge and seek access to the outdoors. P. rudis is extremely troublesome to home and business owners, but does not cause any true damage to home structures, textiles, foods, or humans. Piles of dead flies left in the walls can sometimes lead to secondary infestations of carpet or larder beetles and rodents.

=== Control methods ===
Attempting to control the cluster fly by controlling their earthworm host is not recommended or effective since flies may originate from more than a mile away from the infestation site. Once Pollenia rudis enters a home, it is almost impossible to kill enough of the flies to fully eradicate them. In order to prevent cluster flies from entering a house, all exterior cracks and openings should be caulked or sealed. This includes (sealing) light fixtures, electrical outlets, windows, and baseboards. Persistent use of insecticides has also been shown to reduce fly numbers if sprayed on the exterior of a home. However, these methods are not guaranteed for preventing infestations. When cluster flies do invade the home, they are extremely difficult to exterminate. Trying to kill the flies with a fly swatter leads to greasy spots on walls and upholstery as well as a lingering smell of buckwheat honey. Once spring arrives the flies will try to leave on their own in order to lay eggs, but many times they enter other living areas of the home instead. Vacuum cleaners and aerosol insecticides may be used to control visible, sluggish flies, but professional extermination is the most reliable method for eliminating an infestation.

=== Importance in forensic entomology ===
Unlike the majority of blow flies in the family Calliphoridae, Pollenia rudis does not play a large role in the medico-criminal subfield of forensic entomology. While most blow flies are attracted to rotting or decomposing matter, P. rudis is solely parasitic on earthworms and is unable to complete larval development on carrion. This unique characteristic makes it uncommon to see this particular blowfly near forensic investigations. However, the urban subfield of forensic entomology has been closely monitoring P. rudis because of its tendency to infest buildings and its status as a potential disease vector. Urban entomology, which deals with the insects that affect humans and their immediate environment, is responsible for investigating economic issues and civil proceedings involving arthropods. There have been several economically hampering cases of P. rudis infestation around the world. For example, in New Zealand an entire city’s water reservoir tank was drained due to high levels of fecal coliform bacteria produced by mass amounts of cluster flies residing in the tank. Due to cases like these, scientists have investigated the association of Pollenia rudis and its disease vector capability. In 1973, a massive infestation of cluster flies in a German hospital triggered an investigation of the relationship between P. rudis and bacteria pathogen transmission. Careful examination of the flies revealed P. rudis is only capable of transmitting bacteria that causes opportunistic infections. These results indicate that “mass infestations of cluster flies occurring in sensitive areas, especially in hospitals, may cause a low, but not neglectable health threat due to mechanical transmission of bacterial pathogens.”
