= Melanodexia satanica =

Scientific classification
- Kingdom: Animalia
- Phylum: Arthropoda
- Clade: Pancrustacea
- Class: Insecta
- Order: Diptera
- Family: Polleniidae
- Genus: Melanodexia
- Species: M. satanica

Binomial name
- Melanodexia satanica Shannon, 1926

Species of fly

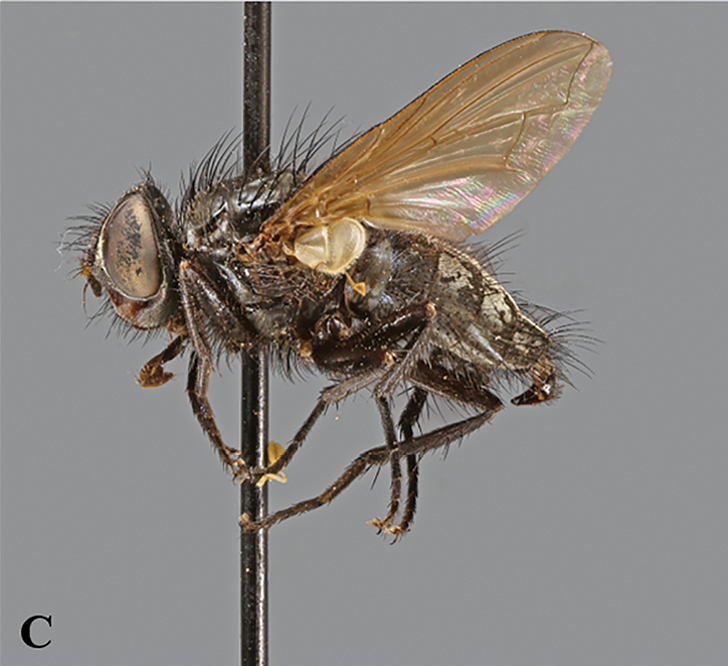

Melanodexia satanica is a species of cluster fly in the family Polleniidae.

== Distribution ==
United States.
