= Alvamaja =

Scientific classification
- Kingdom: Animalia
- Phylum: Arthropoda
- Class: Insecta
- Order: Diptera
- Superfamily: Oestroidea
- Family: Polleniidae
- Genus: Alvamaja; Rognes, 2010
- Species: A. chlorometallica

Binomial name
- Alvamaja chlorometallica Rognes, 2010

Genus of flies

Alvamaja is a monotypic genus of flies, containing only the species Alvamaja chlorometallica. Although originally placed in the family Rhinophoridae, it belongs to the family Polleniidae.

This species is found in Europe (Romania, Serbia).
