= Anthracomyza =

Scientific classification
- Kingdom: Animalia
- Phylum: Arthropoda
- Class: Insecta
- Order: Diptera
- Superfamily: Oestroidea
- Family: Polleniidae
- Genus: Anthracomyza; Malloch, 1928

Type species
- Anthracomyia atratula Malloch, 1927

Genus of flies

Anthracomyza is a genus of flies assigned with some uncertainty to the family Polleniidae.

== Species ==
- Anthracomyza atratula (Malloch, 1927)
