= Dexopollenia =

Scientific classification
- Kingdom: Animalia
- Phylum: Arthropoda
- Class: Insecta
- Order: Diptera
- Superfamily: Oestroidea
- Family: Polleniidae
- Genus: Dexopollenia; Townsend, 1917

Type species
- Dexopollenia testacea Townsend, 1917

Genus of insects

Dexopollenia is a genus of flies in the family Polleniidae.

== Species ==
- Dexopollenia aurantifulva Feng, 2004
- Dexopollenia bicolor Malloch, 1935
- Dexopollenia bicoloripes Malloch, 1931
- Dexopollenia chrysothrix Bezzi, 1927
- Dexopollenia disemura Fan & Deng, 1993
- Dexopollenia fangensis Kurahashi, 1995
- Dexopollenia flava (Aldrich, 1930)
- Dexopollenia geniculata Malloch, 1935
- Dexopollenia hirtiventris Malloch, 1935
- Dexopollenia luteola (Villeneuve, 1927)
- Dexopollenia maculata (Villeneuve, 1933)
- Dexopollenia monsdulitae (Senior-White, Aubertin & Smart, 1940)
- Dexopollenia nigra Kurahashi, 1987
- Dexopollenia nigriscens Fan, 1992
- Dexopollenia papua Kurahashi, 1987
- Dexopollenia sakulasi Kurahashi, 1987
- Dexopollenia testacea Townsend, 1917
- Dexopollenia tianmushanensis Fan, 1997
- Dexopollenia trifascia (Walker, 1861)
- Dexopollenia uniseta Fan, 1992
- Dexopollenia yuphae Kurahashi, 1995
