= Nesodexia =

Scientific classification
- Kingdom: Animalia
- Phylum: Arthropoda
- Class: Insecta
- Order: Diptera
- Superfamily: Oestroidea
- Family: Polleniidae
- Genus: Nesodexia; Villeneuve, 1911

Type species
- Nesodexia corsicana Villeneuve, 1911

Genus of insects

Nesodexia is a genus of flies tentatively assigned to the family Polleniidae.

== Species ==
- Nesodexia corsicana Villeneuve, 1911
