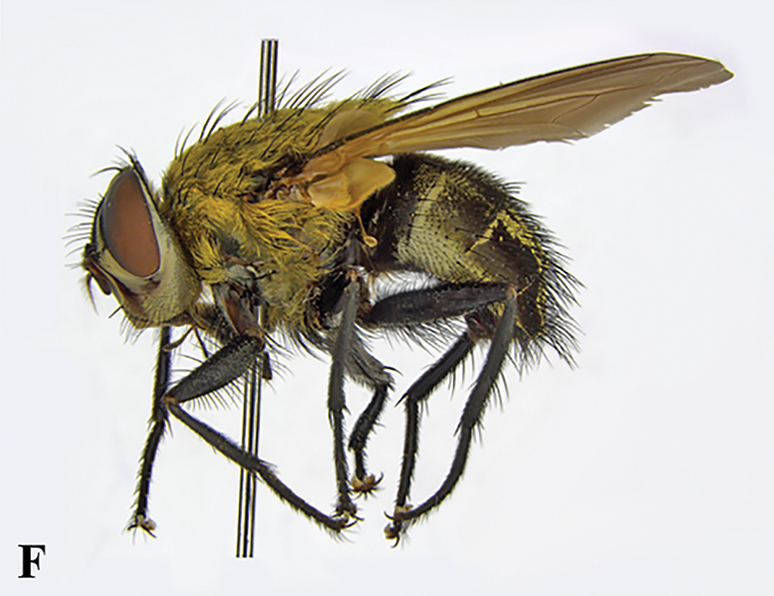
- Xanthotryxus mongol

Scientific classification
- Kingdom: Animalia
- Phylum: Arthropoda
- Clade: Pancrustacea
- Class: Insecta
- Order: Diptera
- Superfamily: Oestroidea
- Family: Polleniidae
- Genus: Xanthotryxus; Aldrich, 1930

Type species
- Xanthotryxus mongol Aldrich, 1930

= Xanthotryxus =

Genus of insects

Xanthotryxus is a genus of flies in the family Polleniidae.

== Species ==
- Xanthotryxus auratus (Séguy, 1934)
- Xanthotryxus bazini (Séguy, 1934)
- Xanthotryxus draco Aldrich, 1930
- Xanthotryxus ludingensis Fan, 1992
- Xanthotryxus melanurus Fan, 1992
- Xanthotryxus mongol Aldrich, 1930
- Xanthotryxus uniapicalis Fan, 1992
