= Solidago satanica =

Scientific classification
- Kingdom: Plantae
- Clade: Tracheophytes
- Clade: Angiosperms
- Clade: Eudicots
- Clade: Asterids
- Order: Asterales
- Family: Asteraceae
- Genus: Solidago
- Species: S. satanica

Binomial name
- Solidago satanica Lunell

Synonyms
- Doria satanica (Lunell) Lunell

Species of flowering plant

Solidago satanica, the devil's goldenrod, is a rare North American plant species in the family Asteraceae. It is native to the state of North Dakota in the north-central United States. It was first described in 1911 from specimens collected near Devil's Lake in Ramsey County.

Solidago satanica is a perennial herb up to 80 cm (32 inches) tall. Leaves are lance-shaped. Flower heads are each about 3 mm high. The species appears to be closely related to S. canadensis.
