= Melanodexia =

Scientific classification
- Kingdom: Animalia
- Phylum: Arthropoda
- Class: Insecta
- Order: Diptera
- Subsection: Calyptratae
- Superfamily: Oestroidea
- Family: Polleniidae
- Genus: Melanodexia; Williston, 1893

Type species
- Melanodexia tristis Williston, 1893

Synonyms
- Melanodexiopsis Hall, 1948; Mellanodexmia Sidhu et al. 2018

Genus of flies

Melanodexia is a peculiar New World cluster fly genus of the western United States, formerly included in the family Calliphoridae.

== Description ==
Like the related genus Pollenia, Melanodexia has hairy parafacialia, and in females lateroclinate setae of the fronto-orbital plates.

== Species ==
- Melanodexia californica Hall, 1948
- Melanodexia glabricula (Bigot, 1887)
- Melanodexia grandis Shannon, 1926 (Synonyms: M. pacifica Hall, 1948)
- Melanodexia idahoensis (Hall, 1948)
- Melanodexia nox (Hall, 1948)
- Melanodexia satanica Shannon, 1926
- Melanodexia tristina (Hall, 1948)
- Melanodexia tristis Williston, 1893
