= La Satanica =

Japanese manga

ラ・サタニカ (Ra・Satanika)
- Genre: Yaoi
- Manga
- Written by: Momoko Tenzen
- Published by: Core Magazine
- English publisher: NA: Digital Manga Publishing
- Published: August 3, 2008

La Satanica (ラ・サタニカ, Ra・Satanika; Italian for "The Satanic") is a Japanese manga anthology written and illustrated by Momoko Tenzen. It is licensed in North America by Digital Manga Publishing, which released the manga through its June imprint, on 9 September 2009.

== Reception ==
Rachel Bentham liked the role reversal between the characters in that Mashita, the pursuer, becomes submissive in sexual matters. Danielle Leigh enjoyed the characterisation of the leads, especially their "lack of cool as they fall in love". Michelle Smith found the manga "sweet and sexy simultaneously", and was impressed by the fact that the characters spend a chapter "to really, really make sure that it's what both of them want".
