= Melanella grandis =

- Shell of Melanella grandis

Scientific classification
- Kingdom: Animalia
- Phylum: Mollusca
- Class: Gastropoda
- Subclass: Caenogastropoda
- Order: Littorinimorpha
- Family: Eulimidae
- Genus: Melanella
- Species: M. grandis

Binomial name
- Melanella grandis (A. Adams, 1853)

Synonyms
- Eulima grandis A. Adams, 1853

Species of sea snail

Melanella grandis, common name the Roeger's eulima, is a species of sea snail, a marine gastropod mollusk in the family Eulimidae.

== Description ==
The length of the shell attains 40 mm.

(Described as Eulima grandis) The shell is solid and opaque. There are 15 whorls, which are rather flat and feature continuous lateral varices. The body whorl is angulated at the periphery.

== Distribution ==
This marine species occurs off the Philippines Malaysia, Japan and Australia (Northern Territory, Queensland, Western Australia).
