= Andy Lehrer =

Romanian entomologist (1930–2014)

Andy Z. Lehrer
- אנדי לרר
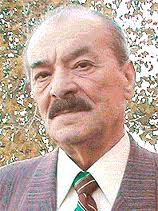
- Born: May 16, 1930; Iaşi, Romania
- Died: February 6, 2014 (aged 83); Israel
- Occupation: Entomologist
- Notable work: Fragmenta Dipterologica

Andy Z. Lehrer (Hebrew: אנדי לרר; 16 May 1930 – 6 February 2014) was a Romanian entomologist. From 1996 until his death, he worked as a research associate in the laboratory of Zoology at the University of Tel Aviv in Tel Aviv, Israel. For several years, he studied flesh flies and blow flies from all over the world.

Lehrer was born in Iaşi, Romania. He died in February 2014, aged 83.

For many years he self-published the journal Fragmenta Dipterologica, for which he was almost the sole contributing author.

== Toponymy dispute ==
In 2005, Lehrer reclassified the genus Bengalia into 11 new genera in 4 subfamilies within a newly designated family, Bengaliidae. The family designation was disputed by Rognes (2006) who noted that it was equivalent to the already established tribe Bengaliini, and that treating it as a family renders the Calliphoridae paraphyletic. Further Rognes considered all the new genera created as junior names for Bengalia. Lehrer's work added 49 species to the already described 41 species and 18 of these new species were treated as invalid by Rognes. At present, major sources of Dipteran taxonomy do not recognize Lehrer's 10 new genera as valid, nor the 18 new species treated as invalid by Rognes (e.g.).

This dispute reflects that at present, there is no consensus as to the best way to subdivide the Calliphoridae, which many authorities acknowledge is not a natural group (in this case, polyphyletic); the BioSystematic Database of World Diptera, for example, states "The Calliphoridae are marked as a polyphyletic group of convenience as at the present we are unwilling to reduce the Oestridae to a subordinated group within a monophyletic Calliphoridae nor to elevate a number of other groups (Polleniidae, Helicoboscidae, and Bengaliidae) so as to properly delimit both Calliphoridae and Oestridae." Similarly, the dispute at the generic level is that some of Lehrer's genera are paraphyletic, and, additionally, that they are based largely or exclusively upon features of the male genitalia, and it is therefore impossible to identify most female specimens to subfamily, let alone genus (the rejection of Lehrer's subdivisions therefore being both taxonomic and a matter of practicality). The dispute at the species level centers on the fact that Lehrer did not include or examine 24 of the 41 known species in his revision, so of the 31 species he validly described that were not immediately synonymized, many could still potentially be synonyms of these 24 excluded species.
