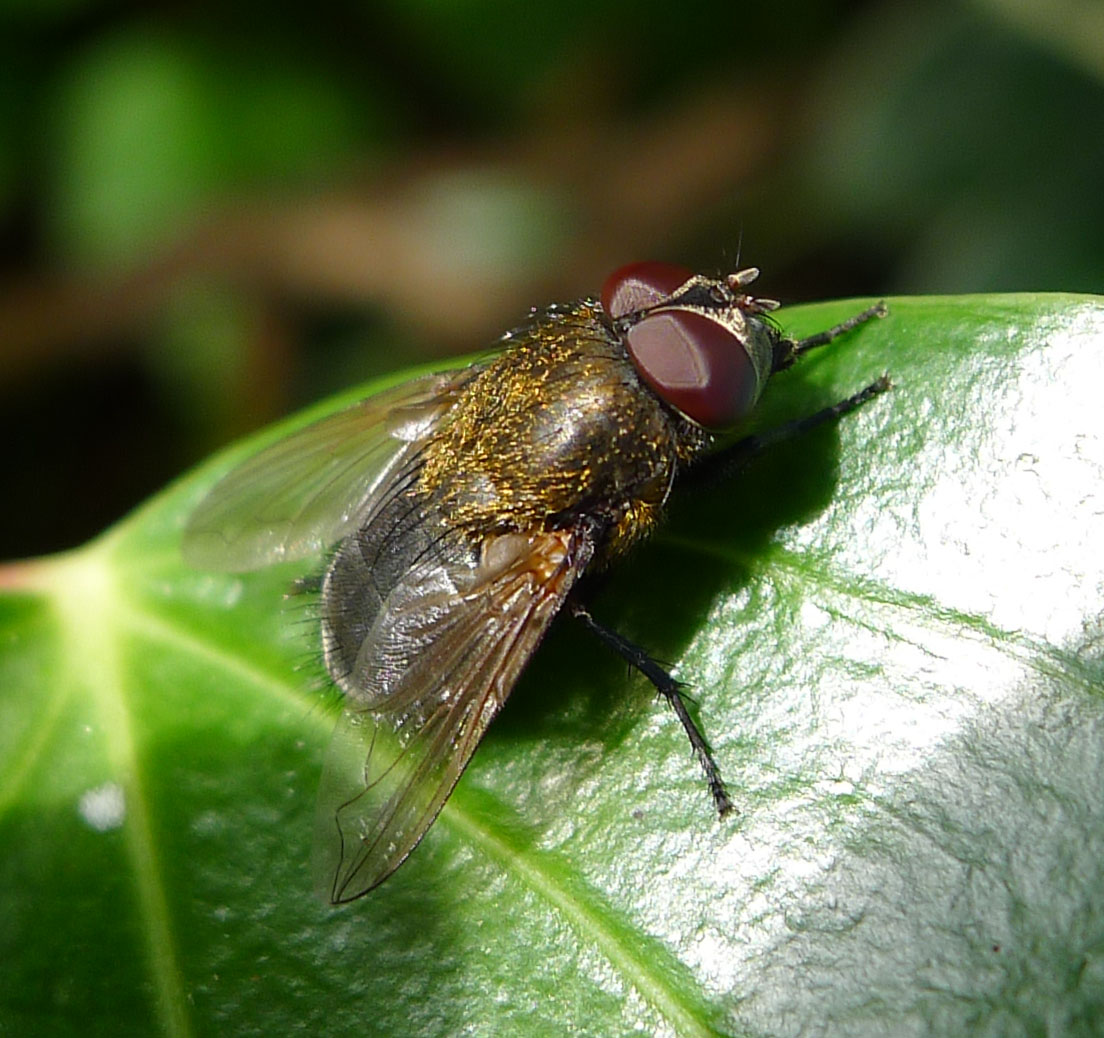
- Pollenia

Scientific classification
- Kingdom: Animalia
- Phylum: Arthropoda
- Class: Insecta
- Order: Diptera
- Superfamily: Oestroidea
- Family: Polleniidae; Brauer & Bergenstamm, 1889

= Polleniidae =

Family of flies

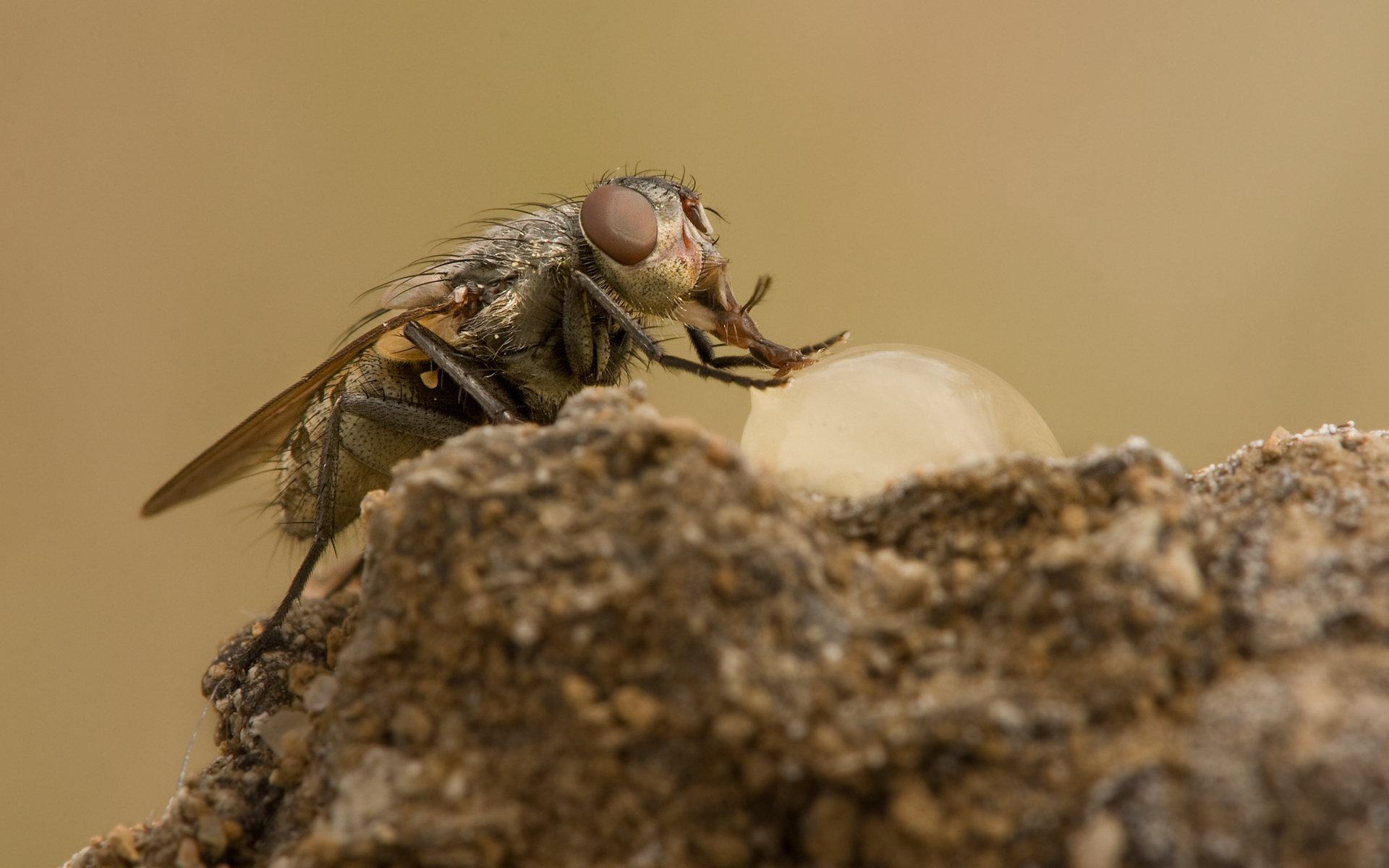
Pollenia rudis female

Polleniidae is a family of flies in the order Diptera. There are at least 6 genera and more than 190 described species placed definitively in Polleniidae, and other genera whose placement here is considered uncertain. The largest genus is Pollenia, with close to 190 species of flies commonly called "cluster flies".

The family Polleniidae has been considered a subfamily of Calliphoridae in the past, containing various genera and species. As a result of phylogenetic analysis, the subfamily Polleniinae was elevated to family rank by Cerretti, et al., in 2019, and assigned the genera listed below.

== Genera ==
- Alvamaja Rognes, 2010
- Dexopollenia Townsend, 1917
- Melanodexia Williston, 1893
- Morinia Robineau-Desvoidy, 1830
- Pollenia Robineau-Desvoidy, 1830 (cluster flies)
- Xanthotryxus Aldrich, 1930

== Incertae sedis ==
- Anthracomyza Malloch, 1928
- Nesodexia Villeneuve, 1911
