= Opalimosina =

Scientific classification
- Kingdom: Animalia
- Phylum: Arthropoda
- Class: Insecta
- Order: Diptera
- Family: Sphaeroceridae
- Subfamily: Limosininae
- Genus: Opalimosina; Roháček, 1983

Type species
- Limosina mirabilis Collin, 1902

Synonyms
- Opalimosina Roháček, 1982

Genus of flies

Opalimosina is a genus of flies belonging to the family Sphaeroceridae.

== Species ==
Subgenus Dentilimosina Roháček, 1983

- O. denticulata (Duda, 1924)

Subgenus Hackmanina Roháček, 1983

- O. czernyi (Duda, 1918)

Subgenus Opalimosina Roháček, 1983

- O. australis Hayashi, 2009
- O. calcarifera (Roháček, 1975)
- O. collini (Richards, 1929)
- O. dolichodasys Hayashi, 2010
- O. mirabilis (Collin, 1902)
- O. monticola Hayashi, 2010
- O. pseudomirabilis Hayashi, 1989
- O. simplex (Richards, 1929)
- O. spathulata Hayashi, 2010
- O. stepheni Papp, 1991

Subgenus Pappiella Roháček, 1983

- O. liliputana (Rondani, 1880)
