= Hilarigona =

Scientific classification
- Domain: Eukaryota
- Kingdom: Animalia
- Phylum: Arthropoda
- Class: Insecta
- Order: Diptera
- Family: Empididae
- Subfamily: Empidinae
- Genus: Hilarigona; Collin, 1933

Type species
- Pachymeria argentata Philippi, 1865

Genus of flies

Hilarigona is a genus of flies in the family Empididae.

== Species ==
- H. aberrans (Bezzi, 1909)
- H. abnormis (Bezzi, 1909)
- H. annulata (Philippi, 1865)
- H. anomalicauda Collin, 1933
- H. argentata (Philippi, 1865)
- H. brachygastra (Philippi, 1865)
- H. caishana Smith, 1962
- H. chiloensis (Brèthes, 1924)
- H. connexiva Collin, 1933
- H. crassistyla Collin, 1933
- H. cupari Smith, 1962
- H. fulvipes (Philippi, 1865)
- H. krogeri Frey, 1952
- H. majerona Smith, 1962
- H. modesta (Philippi, 1865)
- H. obscurata (Philippi, 1865)
- H. obscuripennis (Philippi, 1865)
- H. pexata Collin, 1933
- H. polita Collin, 1933
- H. producta Collin, 1933
- H. pudica Collin, 1933
- H. rubripes (Philippi, 1865)
- H. setulis Collin, 1933
- H. similis Collin, 1933
- H. unmaculata Yang & Yang, 1995
