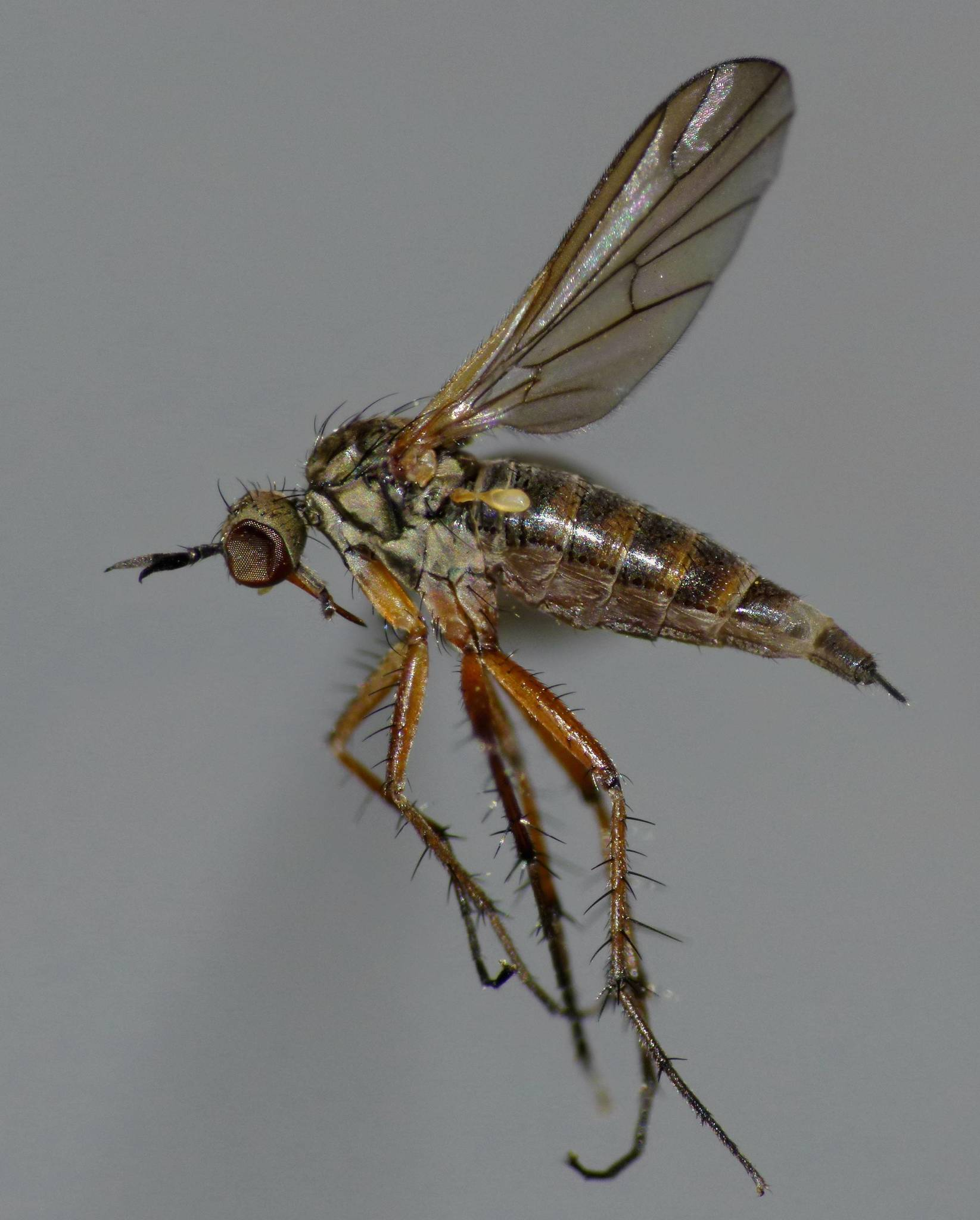
- Empidadelpha propria

Scientific classification
- Kingdom: Animalia
- Phylum: Arthropoda
- Class: Insecta
- Order: Diptera
- Family: Empididae
- Subfamily: Empidinae
- Genus: Empidadelpha; Collin, 1928

Type species
- Empidadelpha propria Collin, 1928

= Empidadelpha =

Genus of flies

Empidadelpha is a genus of dance flies in the family Empididae.

== Species ==
- E. propria Collin, 1928
- E. sobrina Collin, 1933
- E. torrentalis (Miller, 1923)
- E. pokekeao Kerr and Tweed, 2021
