= Deuteragonista =

Scientific classification
- Kingdom: Animalia
- Phylum: Arthropoda
- Class: Insecta
- Order: Diptera
- Family: Empididae
- Subfamily: Empidinae
- Genus: Deuteragonista; Philippi, 1865

Type species
- Deuteragonista bicolor Philippi, 1865

Synonyms
- Phleboctena Bezzi, 1909

Genus of flies

Deuteragonista is a genus of flies in the family Empididae.

== Species ==
- D. bicolor Philippi, 1865
- D. denotata Collin, 1933
- D. fulvilata Collin, 1933
- D. lutea (Bezzi, 1909)
- D. stigmatica Collin, 1933
- D. terminalis Collin, 1933
- D. thoracica Collin, 1933
- D. villosula Bigot, 1889
