= Empidadelpha sobrina =

Scientific classification
- Kingdom: Animalia
- Phylum: Arthropoda
- Class: Insecta
- Order: Diptera
- Superfamily: Empidoidea
- Family: Empididae
- Subfamily: Empidinae
- Genus: Empidadelpha
- Species: E. sobrina

Binomial name
- Empidadelpha sobrina Collin, 1933

Species of fly

Empidadelpha sobrina is a species of dance flies, in the fly family Empididae.
