= Hilarempis =

Scientific classification
- Kingdom: Animalia
- Phylum: Arthropoda
- Clade: Pancrustacea
- Class: Insecta
- Order: Diptera
- Family: Empididae
- Subfamily: Empidinae
- Genus: Hilarempis; Bezzi, 1905

Type species
- Hilarempis nudifacies Bezzi, 1905

Synonyms
- Heterempis Brèthes, 1909; Hilaropus White, 1916

Genus of flies

Hilarempis is a genus of flies in the family Empididae.

== Species ==
- H. adrianus Smith, 1969
- H. alpha Smith, 1969
- H. antarctica (Walker, 1836)
- H. antenniseta Smith, 1969
- H. argentella Collin, 1928
- H. argentifera Bezzi, 1909
- H. argentula Becker, 1919
- H. argyrozoma (Philippi, 1865)
- H. barbatula Bezzi, 1909
- H. basalis Smith, 1969
- H. basuta Smith, 1967
- H. benhami (Miller, 1913)
- H. beta Smith, 1969
- H. bicingulata Bezzi, 1909
- H. biseriata Collin, 1933
- H. brachyrrhyncha Thomson, 1869
- H. breviseta Smith, 1967
- H. brevistyla Collin, 1928
- H. carinata Bezzi, 1909
- H. carlieri Smith, 1969
- H. cervina (Loew, 1858)
- H. cillata Collin, 1933
- H. cineracea Collin, 1928
- H. commoda Collin, 1933
- H. completa (Loew, 1858)
- H. cotoxantha Blanchard, 1852
- H. crassitarsus Smith, 1969
- H. cyanescens (Bezzi, 1904)
- H. darglensis Smith, 1969
- H. dasytibia Smith, 1969
- H. dichropleura Collin, 1928
- H. diversimana Collin, 1928
- H. dolosa Collin, 1933
- H. dumicola (Philippi, 1865)
- H. echinata (White, 1916)
- H. elegans Bezzi, 1909
- H. facilis Collin, 1933
- H. famillaris Collin, 1933
- H. fasciata Smith, 1969
- H. fratercula Smith, 1969
- H. fulva (Philippi, 1865)
- H. fulva (Walker, 1836)
- H. fulvipes (Hutton, 1901)
- H. genualis Collin, 1933
- H. griseiventris (Philippi, 1865)
- H. gubernator Collin, 1933
- H. gymnaspis Bezzi, 1909
- H. hammondi Smith, 1969
- H. heterogastra (Loew, 1858)
- H. hilaraeformis (Bezzi, 1904)
- H. huttoni Bezzi, 1904
- H. idonea Collin, 1933
- H. imbeza Smith, 1969
- H. immota Collin, 1928
- H. inerma Smith, 1969
- H. inops Collin, 1933
- H. insularis Brèthes, 1924
- H. julianus Smith, 1967
- H. juri Smith, 1962
- H. kaiteriensis (Miller, 1913)
- H. languida Collin, 1933
- H. laticornis (Bigot, 1888)
- H. levicula Collin, 1933
- H. longipennis Smith, 1967
- H. longistyla Collin, 1928
- H. magellanica (Bigot, 1888)
- H. maluinensis Enderlein, 1912
- H. mediana Collin, 1933
- H. mendozana (Brèthes, 1924)
- H. minthaphila Collin, 1928
- H. moreirai Brèthes, 1924
- H. msingi Smith, 1967
- H. neptunus Smith, 1969
- H. nigra Miller, 1923
- H. nigrimana (White, 1916)
- H. nigrimanus (White, 1916)
- H. nondescripta Smith, 1969
- H. notabilis Collin, 1933
- H. nudifacies Bezzi, 1905
- H. ochrozona Collin, 1928
- H. ordinata Collin, 1933
- H. otiosa Collin, 1933
- H. pallida (Philippi, 1865)
- H. pallidifurca (White, 1916)
- H. peregrina (White, 1916)
- H. polychaeta Bezzi, 1905
- H. propinqua Collin, 1933
- H. quadrifaria Becker, 1919
- H. robusta Smith, 1969
- H. rodriguezi Carrera, 1954
- H. shunina Smith, 1962
- H. sigillata Collin, 1933
- H. similipes Collin, 1933
- H. simillima Collin, 1928
- H. smithii (Hutton, 1901)
- H. sordida (Loew, 1858)
- H. soror Smith, 1969
- H. sp. Smith, 1962
- H. spinosa Bezzi, 1909
- H. stenostoma Collin, 1933
- H. subdita Collin, 1928
- H. tenuicornis Smith, 1969
- H. tephrodes (Philippi, 1865)
- H. tibialis Collin, 1933
- H. trichopleura Collin, 1928
- H. trochanterata Smith, 1969
- H. tucuna Smith, 1962
- H. undumeni Smith, 1969
- H. uniseta Collin, 1928
- H. vanellus (Schiner, 1868)
- H. varians (Bigot, 1889)
- H. vicina Smith, 1969
- H. walkeri Bezzi, 1909
- H. xanthocera Bezzi, 1905
