= Hilarempis simillima =

Scientific classification
- Kingdom: Animalia
- Phylum: Arthropoda
- Class: Insecta
- Order: Diptera
- Superfamily: Empidoidea
- Family: Empididae
- Subfamily: Empidinae
- Genus: Hilarempis
- Species: H. simillima

Binomial name
- Hilarempis simillima Collin, 1928

Species of fly

Hilarempis simillima is a species of dance flies, in the fly family Empididae.
