= Cladodromia mediana =

Scientific classification
- Kingdom: Animalia
- Phylum: Arthropoda
- Class: Insecta
- Order: Diptera
- Family: Empididae
- Genus: Cladodromia
- Species: C. mediana

Binomial name
- Cladodromia mediana Collin, 1933

Species of fly

Cladodromia mediana is a species of dance flies, in the fly family Empididae.
