= Opalimosina (subgenus) =

Scientific classification
- Kingdom: Animalia
- Phylum: Arthropoda
- Clade: Pancrustacea
- Class: Insecta
- Order: Diptera
- Family: Sphaeroceridae
- Genus: Opalimosina
- Subgenus: Opalimosina; Roháček, 1983

Type species
- Limosina mirabilis Collin, 1902

Synonyms
- Opalimosina Roháček, 1982

Subgenus of flies

Opalimosina is a subgenus of flies belonging to the family Sphaeroceridae.

== Species ==
- O. australis Hayashi, 2009
- O. calcarifera (Roháček, 1975)
- O. collini (Richards, 1929)
- O. dolichodasys Hayashi, 2010
- O. mirabilis (Collin, 1902)
- O. monticola Hayashi, 2010
- O. pseudomirabilis Hayashi, 1989
- O. simplex (Richards, 1929)
- O. spathulata Hayashi, 2010
- O. stepheni Papp, 1991
