= Deuteragonista thoracica =

Scientific classification
- Kingdom: Animalia
- Phylum: Arthropoda
- Class: Insecta
- Order: Diptera
- Family: Empididae
- Genus: Deuteragonista
- Species: D. thoracica

Binomial name
- Deuteragonista thoracica Collin, 1933

Species of fly

Deuteragonista thoracica is a species of dance flies, in the fly family Empididae.
