= Gynatoma =

Scientific classification
- Kingdom: Animalia
- Phylum: Arthropoda
- Class: Insecta
- Order: Diptera
- Family: Empididae
- Subfamily: Empidinae
- Genus: Gynatoma; Collin, 1928

Type species
- Gynatoma quadrilineata Collin, 1928

Genus of flies

Gynatoma is a genus of flies in the family Empididae.

== Species ==
- G. atra Malloch, 1931
- G. continens Collin, 1928
- G. evanescens Collin, 1928
- G. pygmaea Collin, 1928
- G. quadrilineata Collin, 1928
- G. subfulva Collin, 1928
