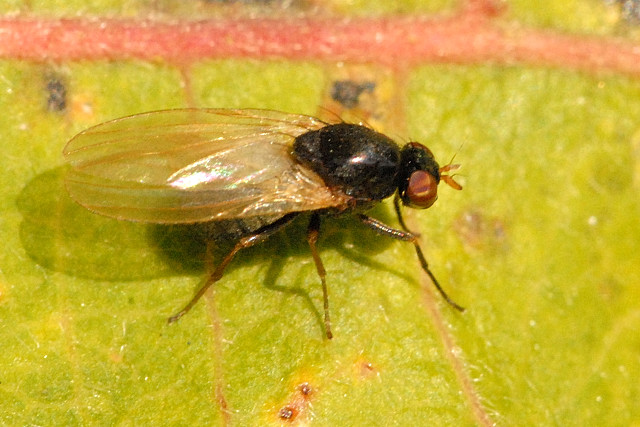
- Calliopum simillimum

Scientific classification
- Kingdom: Animalia
- Phylum: Arthropoda
- Class: Insecta
- Order: Diptera
- Family: Lauxaniidae
- Subfamily: Lauxaniinae
- Genus: Calliopum; Strand, 1928

Type species
- Lauxania scutellata Meigen, 1826 (= Calliopum aeneum Fallén)

Synonyms
- Calliope Westwood, 1840; Calliope Haliday, 1840; Calliope Haliday, 1837; Halidayella Hendel, 1925

= Calliopum =

Genus of flies

Calliopum is a genus of small flies of the family Lauxaniidae.

== Description ==
Calliopum sp. in a meadow

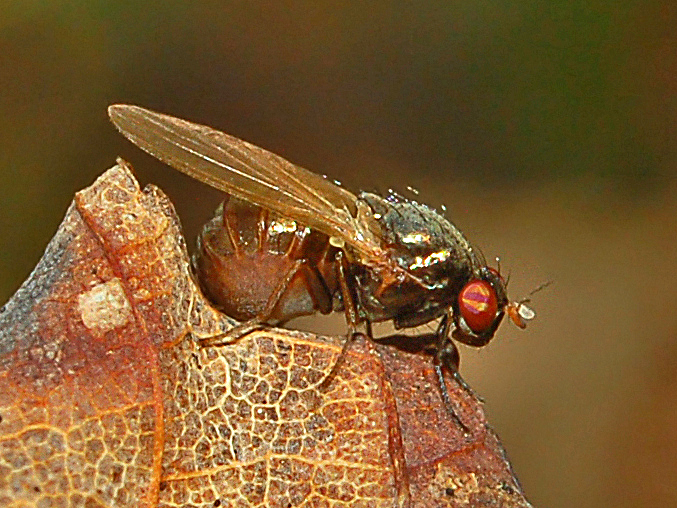
Calliopum sp., Lateral view

Most, but not all, are luscious black or metallic flies. They are smaller than 5 mm and usually have iridescent eyes. Adults can be found from May until December in meadows and hedge rows. The larvae may be phytophagous or saprophagous, mainly feeding on rotting vegetable matter or mining clover leaves.

== Distribution ==
These species are present on most of Europe, in the eastern Palearctic realm, in the Near East and in North Africa.

== Species ==
- C. acrostichalis Sasakawa & Kozanek, 1995
- C. aeneum (Fallén, 1820)
- C. albomaculatum (Strobl, 1909)
- C. annulatum (Becker, 1907)
- C. blaisdelli (Cresson, 1920)
- C. caucasicum Shatalkin, 1996
- C. ceianui Papp, 1984
- C. dolabriforme Sasakawa & Kozanek, 1995
- C. elisae (Meigen, 1826)
- C. ellisiorum Shatalkin, 2000
- C. geniculatum (Fabricius, 1805)
- C. hispanicum (Mik, 1881)
- C. indecorum (Loew, 1862)
- C. livingstoni (Coquillett, 1898)
- C. nigerrimum (Melander, 1913)
- C. oosterbroeki Shatalkin, 2000
- C. pacificum (Cole, 1912)
- C. potanini Czerny, 1935
- C. quadrisetosum (Thomson, 1869)
- C. rufipes (Czerny, 1932)
- C. sakhalinicum Shatalkin, 1996
- C. scutellata (Curran, 1926)
- C. simillimum (Collin, 1933)
- C. splendidum Papp, 1978
- C. tripodium Carles-Tolra, 2001
- C. tunisicum Papp, 1981
