= Gynatoma subfulva =

Scientific classification
- Kingdom: Animalia
- Phylum: Arthropoda
- Class: Insecta
- Order: Diptera
- Superfamily: Empidoidea
- Family: Empididae
- Subfamily: Empidinae
- Genus: Gynatoma
- Species: G. subfulva

Binomial name
- Gynatoma subfulva Collin, 1933

Species of fly

Gynatoma subfulva is a species of dance flies, in the fly family Empididae.
