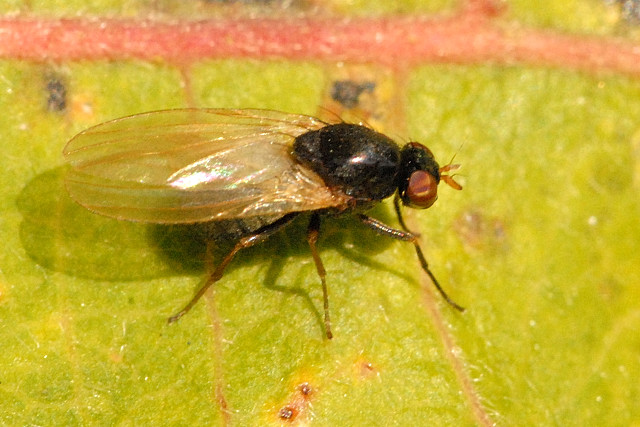

Scientific classification
- Kingdom: Animalia
- Phylum: Arthropoda
- Class: Insecta
- Order: Diptera
- Family: Lauxaniidae
- Genus: Calliopum
- Species: C. simillimum

Binomial name
- Calliopum simillimum (Collin, 1933)

Synonyms
- Lauxania simillimum Collin, 1933

= Calliopum simillimum =

Species of fly

Calliopum simillimum is a species of fly in the family Lauxaniidae. It is found in the Palearctic.
