= Cladodromia pollinosa =

Scientific classification
- Kingdom: Animalia
- Phylum: Arthropoda
- Clade: Pancrustacea
- Class: Insecta
- Order: Diptera
- Family: Empididae
- Genus: Cladodromia
- Species: C. pollinosa

Binomial name
- Cladodromia pollinosa Collin, 1938

Species of fly

Cladodromia pollinosa is a species of dance flies, in the fly family Empididae.
