= Deuteragonista denotata =

Scientific classification
- Kingdom: Animalia
- Phylum: Arthropoda
- Class: Insecta
- Order: Diptera
- Family: Empididae
- Genus: Deuteragonista
- Species: D. denotata

Binomial name
- Deuteragonista denotata Collin, 1933

Species of dance fly

Deuteragonista denotata is a species of dance flies, in the fly family Empididae.
