= Hilarigona anomalicauda =

Scientific classification
- Kingdom: Animalia
- Phylum: Arthropoda
- Clade: Pancrustacea
- Class: Insecta
- Order: Diptera
- Superfamily: Empidoidea
- Family: Empididae
- Subfamily: Empidinae
- Genus: Hilarigona
- Species: H. anomalicauda

Binomial name
- Hilarigona anomalicauda Collin, 1933

Species of fly

Hilarigona anomalicauda is a species of dance flies, in the fly family Empididae.
