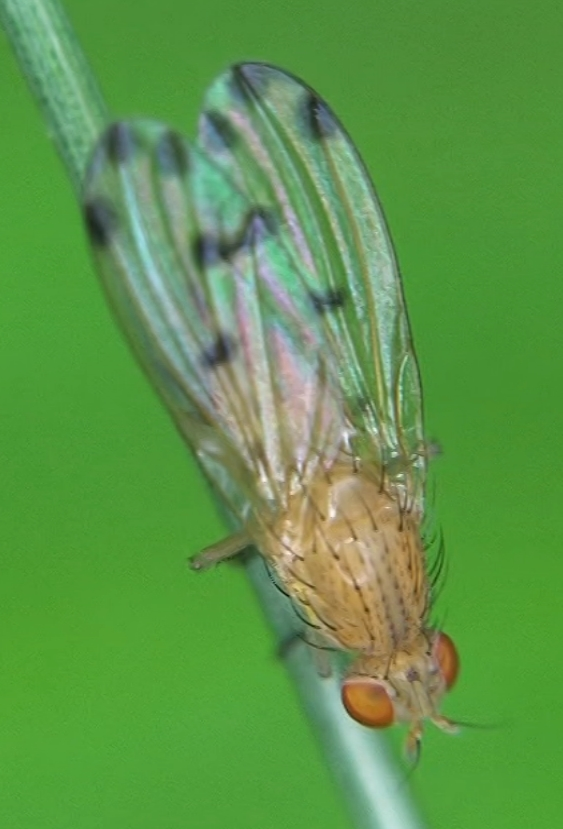
- Meiosimyza decempunctata

Scientific classification
- Domain: Eukaryota
- Kingdom: Animalia
- Phylum: Arthropoda
- Class: Insecta
- Order: Diptera
- Family: Lauxaniidae
- Subfamily: Lauxaniinae
- Genus: Meiosimyza; Hendel, 1925

Type species
- Sapromyza platycephala Fallén, 1820

Synonyms
- Lycia Robineau-Desvoidy, 1830; Lyciella Collin, 1948

= Meiosimyza =

Genus of flies

Meiosimyza platycephala in copula. The female plays a very active role in the courtship.

Meiosimyza is a genus of small flies of the family Lauxaniidae.

== Species ==
A female Meiosimyza platycephala oviposits into moss on a fallen beech in a forest near Marburg, Germany

- M. affinis (Zetterstedt, 1847)
- M. bifaria (Shatalkin, 1993)
- M. brachychaeta (Shatalkin, 1993)
- M. compsella (Hendel, 1903)
- M. conjugata (Becker, 1895)
- M. decempunctata (Fallén, 1820)
- M. decipiens (Loew, 1847)
- M. emarginata (Becker, 1895)
- M. homeotica Shatalkin, 2000
- M. illota (Loew, 1847)
- M. laeta (Zetterstedt, 1838)
- M. mihalyii (Papp, 1978)
- M. nigripalpis (Czerny, 1932)
- M. obtusa (Collin, 1948)
- M. omei (Malloch, 1929)
- M. oreophila (Shatalkin, 1993)
- M. pectinifera (Shatalkin, 1993)
- M. pallidiventris (Fallén, 1820)
- M. platycephala (Loew, 1847)
- M. rorida (Fallén, 1820)
- M. stylata (Papp, 1978)
- M. subfasciata (Zetterstedt, 1838)
- M. subpallidiventris (Papp, 1878)
- M. vittata (Walker, 1849)
