= Cladodromia =

Scientific classification
- Kingdom: Animalia
- Phylum: Arthropoda
- Clade: Pancrustacea
- Class: Insecta
- Order: Diptera
- Family: Empididae
- Subfamily: Hemerodromiinae
- Genus: Cladodromia; Collin, 1933

Type species
- Hemerodromia inca Bezzi, 1905

Genus of flies

Cladodromia is a genus of flies in the family Empididae.

== Species ==
- C. bicolor (Philippi, 1865)
- C. boliviana (Bezzi, 1909)
- C. cana (Bezzi, 1905)
- C. decurtata Collin, 1933
- C. flavipes (Philippi, 1865)
- C. fuscimana (Bezzi, 1909)
- C. futilis Collin, 1928
- C. inca (Bezzi, 1905)
- C. inconstans Collin, 1933
- C. insignita (Collin, 1928)
- C. inturbida (Collin, 1928)
- C. mediana Collin, 1933
- C. minima Collin, 1933
- C. negata (Collin, 1928)
- C. nigrimana (Philippi, 1865)
- C. nitida Collin, 1933
- C. plurivittata (Bezzi, 1909)
- C. pollinosa Collin, 1938
- C. pratincola (Philippi, 1865)
- C. semilugens (Philippi, 1865)
- C. soleata (Collin, 1928)
- C. stigmatica Collin, 1933
- C. tanyptera Collin, 1933
