= Hilarempis nudifacies =

Scientific classification
- Kingdom: Animalia
- Phylum: Arthropoda
- Clade: Pancrustacea
- Class: Insecta
- Order: Diptera
- Superfamily: Empidoidea
- Family: Empididae
- Subfamily: Empidinae
- Genus: Hilarempis
- Species: H. nudifacies

Binomial name
- Hilarempis nudifacies Bezzi, 1905

Species of fly

Hilarempis nudifacies is a species of dance flies, in the fly family Empididae.
