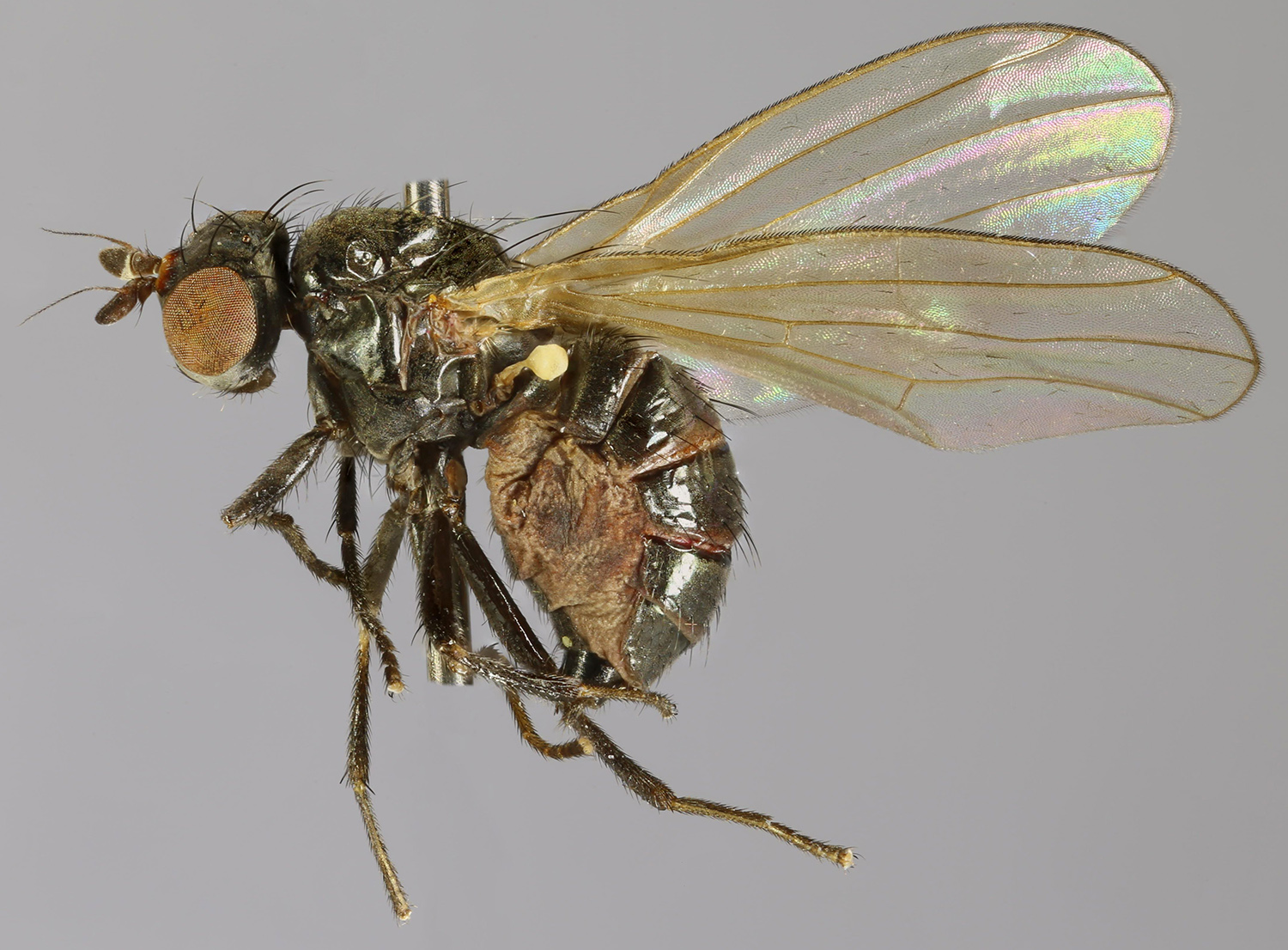
- Calliopum aeneum North Wales

Scientific classification
- Kingdom: Animalia
- Phylum: Arthropoda
- Class: Insecta
- Order: Diptera
- Family: Lauxaniidae
- Genus: Calliopum
- Species: C. aeneum

Binomial name
- Calliopum aeneum (Fallén, 1820)

Synonyms
- Lauxania aeneum Fallén, 1820; Lauxania scutellata Meigen, 1826

= Calliopum aeneum =

Species of fly

Calliopum aeneum is a species of fly in the family Lauxaniidae. It is found in the Palearctic. The larva is a stem miner of Trifolium pratense.
