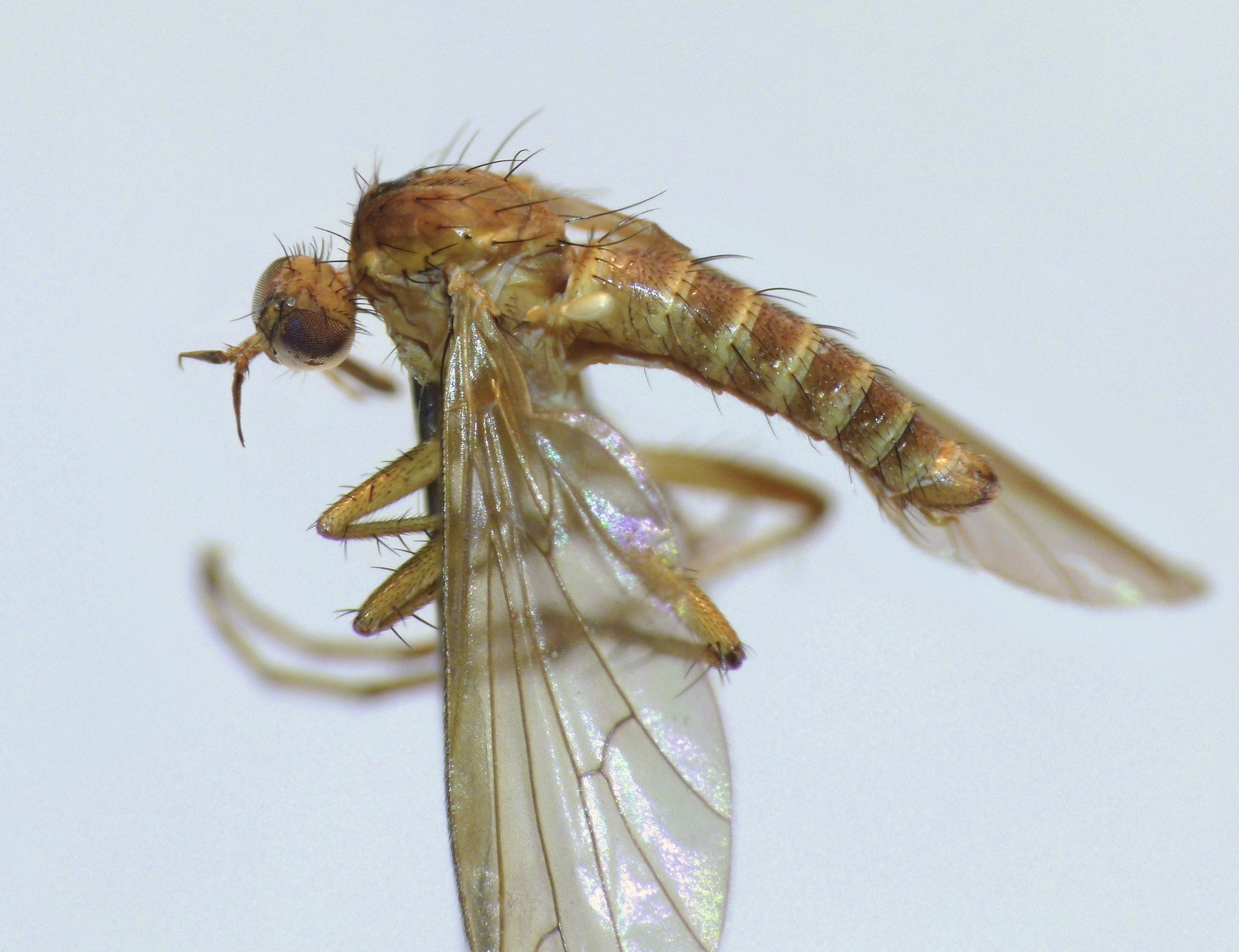

Scientific classification
- Kingdom: Animalia
- Phylum: Arthropoda
- Clade: Pancrustacea
- Class: Insecta
- Order: Diptera
- Family: Empididae
- Genus: Empidadelpha
- Species: E. torrentalis

Binomial name
- Empidadelpha torrentalis (Miller, 1923)

= Empidadelpha torrentalis =

Species of fly

Empidadelpha torrentalis is a species of fly in the family Empididae, endemic to New Zealand.

== Description ==
In this species the antenna are approximately half the length of the fore femur length (arthropod leg). The head, thorax and abdominal tergites are a tawny yellow. The abdominal tergites also have pale yellow margines. In addition wings are tinged yellow. Species in genus Empidadelpha have hairy faces, which is how they can be distiguished from genus Empis.
