= Cladodromia pratincola =

Scientific classification
- Kingdom: Animalia
- Phylum: Arthropoda
- Class: Insecta
- Order: Diptera
- Family: Empididae
- Genus: Cladodromia
- Species: C. pratincola

Binomial name
- Cladodromia pratincola (Philippi, 1865)

Species of fly

Cladodromia pratincola is a species of dance flies, in the fly family Empididae.
