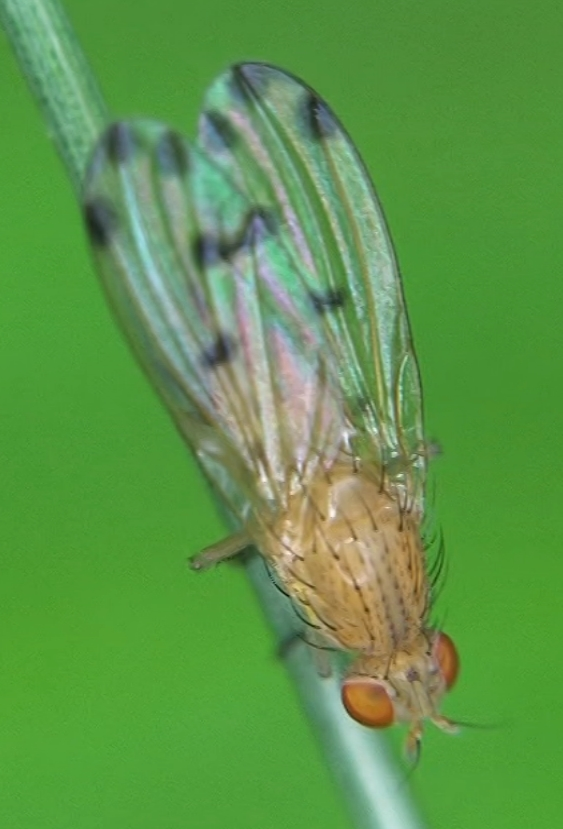

Scientific classification
- Kingdom: Animalia
- Phylum: Arthropoda
- Class: Insecta
- Order: Diptera
- Family: Lauxaniidae
- Genus: Meiosimyza
- Species: M. decempunctata

Binomial name
- Meiosimyza decempunctata (Fallén, 1820)

Synonyms
- Sapromyza decempunctata Fallén, 1820

= Meiosimyza decempunctata =

Species of fly

Meiosimyza decempunctata is a species of small flies of the family Lauxaniidae.
