= Dentilimosina =

Scientific classification
- Kingdom: Animalia
- Phylum: Arthropoda
- Class: Insecta
- Order: Diptera
- Family: Sphaeroceridae
- Genus: Opalimosina
- Subgenus: Dentilimosina Roháček, 1983

Type species
- Limosina denticulata Duda, 1924

Synonyms
- Dentilimosina Roháček, 1982

Genus of flies

Dentilimosina is a subgenus of flies belonging to the family Sphaeroceridae.

== Species ==
- O. denticulata (Duda, 1924)
