= Hilarigona chiloensis =

Scientific classification
- Kingdom: Animalia
- Phylum: Arthropoda
- Clade: Pancrustacea
- Class: Insecta
- Order: Diptera
- Superfamily: Empidoidea
- Family: Empididae
- Subfamily: Empidinae
- Genus: Hilarigona
- Species: H. chiloensis

Binomial name
- Hilarigona chiloensis (Brèthes, 1924)

Species of fly

Hilarigona chiloensis is a species of dance flies, in the fly family Empididae.
