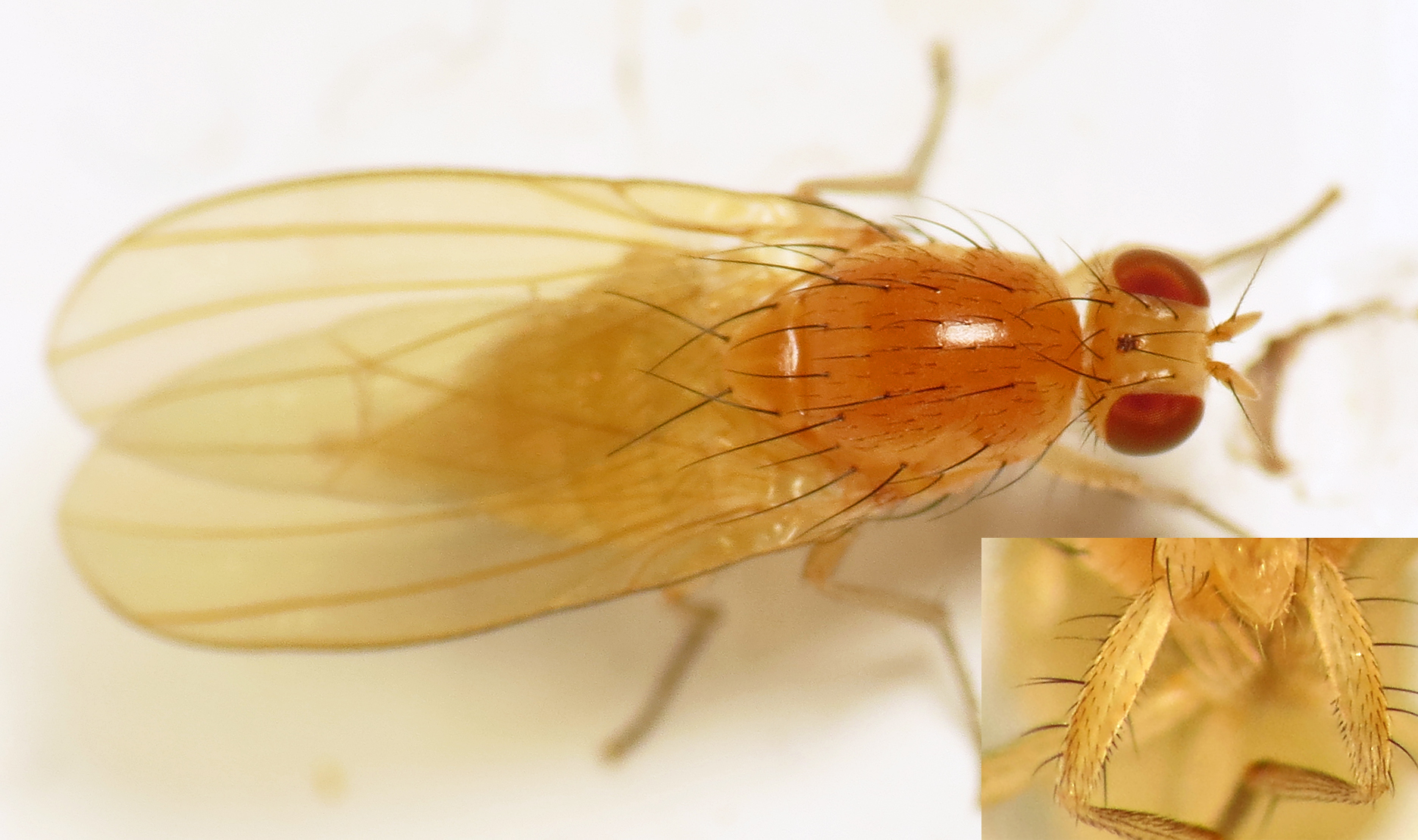

Scientific classification
- Kingdom: Animalia
- Phylum: Arthropoda
- Class: Insecta
- Order: Diptera
- Family: Lauxaniidae
- Genus: Meiosimyza
- Species: M. rorida

Binomial name
- Meiosimyza rorida (Fallén, 1820)

Synonyms
- Lyciella rorida (Fallén, 1820); Sapromyza rorida Fallén, 1820

= Meiosimyza rorida =

Species of fly

Meiosimyza rorida is a species of small flies of the family Lauxaniidae.

== Distribution ==
This species is present in most of Europe, in the Near East, and in the Nearctic realm.

== Habitat ==
This species usually lives in the herbous plants of deciduous wet forests and in hedges rows.

== Description ==
Meiosimyza rorida can reach a body length of about 3.2–4.2 millimetres (0.13–0.17 in). These small flies have rounded, yellowish bodies with dark bristles. They show characteristic sternopleural setae and anteroventral comb-like rows of black spinules on the fore femora. The head is yellowish-white, with large reddish compound eyes. The apex of the antennae is brown. The chest is reddish-yellow, with a shiny mesonotum and long bristles. The thorax and the abdomen are jointed by a narrow waist. The legs are yellowish. The wings are transparent and slightly yellow coloured.

== Biology ==
Females lay their eggs in rotting leaves, which the larvae feed on. Adults are active from May to October. They mainly feed on nectar and pollen of Heracleum sphondylium.

== Gallery ==
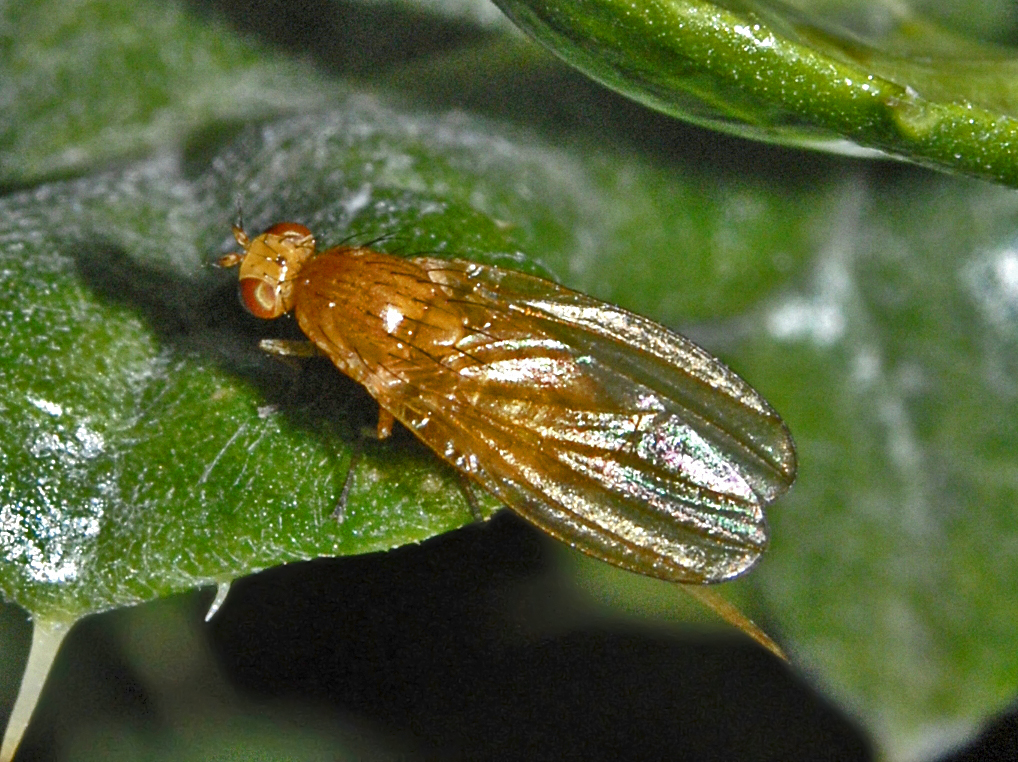
Meiosimyza cf. rorida, dorsal view

Meiosimyza cf. rorida. Video clip
