= Hackmanina =

Scientific classification
- Kingdom: Animalia
- Phylum: Arthropoda
- Class: Insecta
- Order: Diptera
- Family: Sphaeroceridae
- Genus: Opalimosina
- Subgenus: Hackmanina Roháček, 1983

Type species
- Limosina czernyi Duda, 1918

Synonyms
- Hackmanina Roháček, 1982

Genus of flies

Hackmanina is a subgenus of flies belonging to the family Sphaeroceridae.

== Species ==
- O. czernyi (Duda, 1918)
