= Hilarigona obscurata =

Scientific classification
- Kingdom: Animalia
- Phylum: Arthropoda
- Clade: Pancrustacea
- Class: Insecta
- Order: Diptera
- Superfamily: Empidoidea
- Family: Empididae
- Subfamily: Empidinae
- Genus: Hilarigona
- Species: H. obscurata

Binomial name
- Hilarigona obscurata (Philippi, 1865)

Synonyms
- Pachymeria obscurata Bezzi, 1909

Species of fly

Hilarigona obscurata is a species of fly in the family Empididae.
