= Pappiella =

Scientific classification
- Kingdom: Animalia
- Phylum: Arthropoda
- Class: Insecta
- Order: Diptera
- Family: Sphaeroceridae
- Genus: Opalimosina
- Subgenus: Pappiella Roháček, 1983

Type species
- Limosina liliputana Rondani, 1880

Synonyms
- Pappiella Roháček, 1982

Subgenus of flies

Pappiella is a subgenus of flies belonging to the family Sphaeroceridae.

== Species ==
- O. liliputana (Rondani, 1880)
