= Meiosimyza platycephala =

Scientific classification
- Kingdom: Animalia
- Phylum: Arthropoda
- Class: Insecta
- Order: Diptera
- Family: Lauxaniidae
- Genus: Meiosimyza
- Species: M. platycephala

Binomial name
- Meiosimyza platycephala (Loew, 1847)

Synonyms
- Sapromyza platycephala Loew, 1847; Sapromyza difformis Loew, 1858

Species of fly

Meiosimyza platycephala is a species of small flies of the family Lauxaniidae.
