= Deuteragonista lutea =

Scientific classification
- Kingdom: Animalia
- Phylum: Arthropoda
- Class: Insecta
- Order: Diptera
- Infraorder: Asilomorpha
- Superfamily: Empidoidea
- Family: Empididae
- Subfamily: Empidinae
- Genus: Deuteragonista
- Species: D. lutea

Binomial name
- Deuteragonista lutea (Bezzi, 1909)

Synonyms
- Phleboctena lutea Bezzi, 1909

Species of fly

Deuteragonista lutea is a species of dance flies, in the fly family Empididae.
