= Hilarigona obscuripennis =

Scientific classification
- Kingdom: Animalia
- Phylum: Arthropoda
- Clade: Pancrustacea
- Class: Insecta
- Order: Diptera
- Superfamily: Empidoidea
- Family: Empididae
- Subfamily: Empidinae
- Genus: Hilarigona
- Species: H. obscuripennis

Binomial name
- Hilarigona obscuripennis (Bezzi, 1909)

Synonyms
- Pachymeria obscuripennis Bezzi, 1909

Species of fly

Hilarigona obscuripennis is a species of dance flies, in the fly family Empididae.
