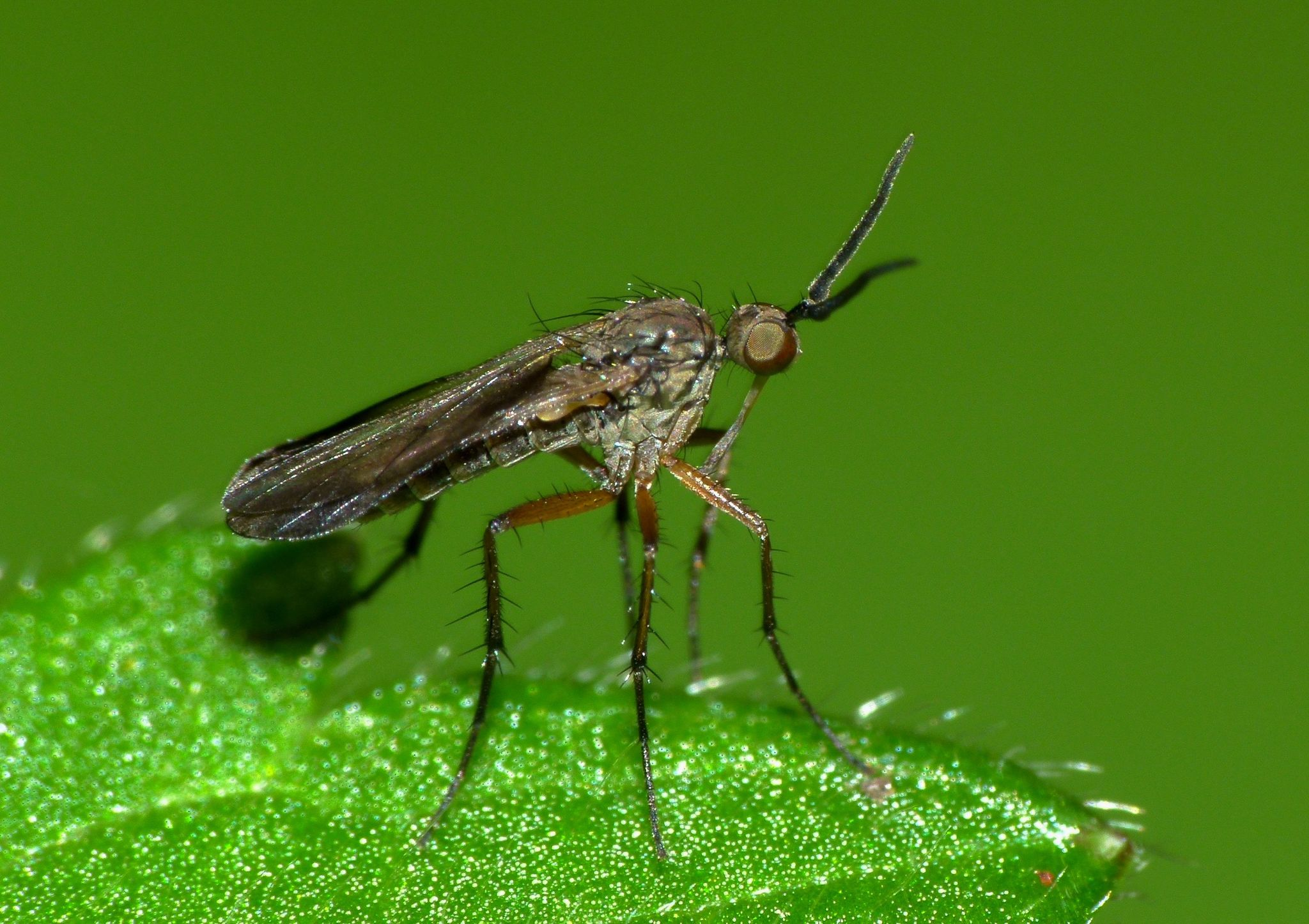

Scientific classification
- Kingdom: Animalia
- Phylum: Arthropoda
- Class: Insecta
- Order: Diptera
- Superfamily: Empidoidea
- Family: Empididae
- Subfamily: Empidinae
- Genus: Empidadelpha
- Species: E. pokekeao

Binomial name
- Empidadelpha pokekeao Kerr & Tweed. 2021

= Empidadelpha pokekeao =

Species of fly

Empidadelpha pokekeao is a species of dance flies, in the fly family Empididae. This fly is according to Kerr and Tweed (2021) "distinguished from other Empidadelpha by the body and leg colours, the greater length of the male postpedicel, and the distinctively darkened wings with very dark cloud at wing tip". Its species name in Te Reo Māori, pokekeao, references this colouration of the wing tip. The holotype is stored Otago Museum with paratypes also at the New Zealand Arthropod Collection.
