= Opalimosina mirabilis =

Scientific classification
- Kingdom: Animalia
- Phylum: Arthropoda
- Clade: Pancrustacea
- Class: Insecta
- Order: Diptera
- Family: Sphaeroceridae
- Genus: Opalimosina
- Subgenus: Opalimosina
- Species: O. mirabilis

Binomial name
- Opalimosina mirabilis (Collin, 1902)

Synonyms
- Limosina mirabilis Collin, 1902

Species of fly

Opalimosina mirabilis is a species of lesser dung flies (insects in the family Sphaeroceridae).
