= James Edward Collin =

English entomologist (1876–1968)

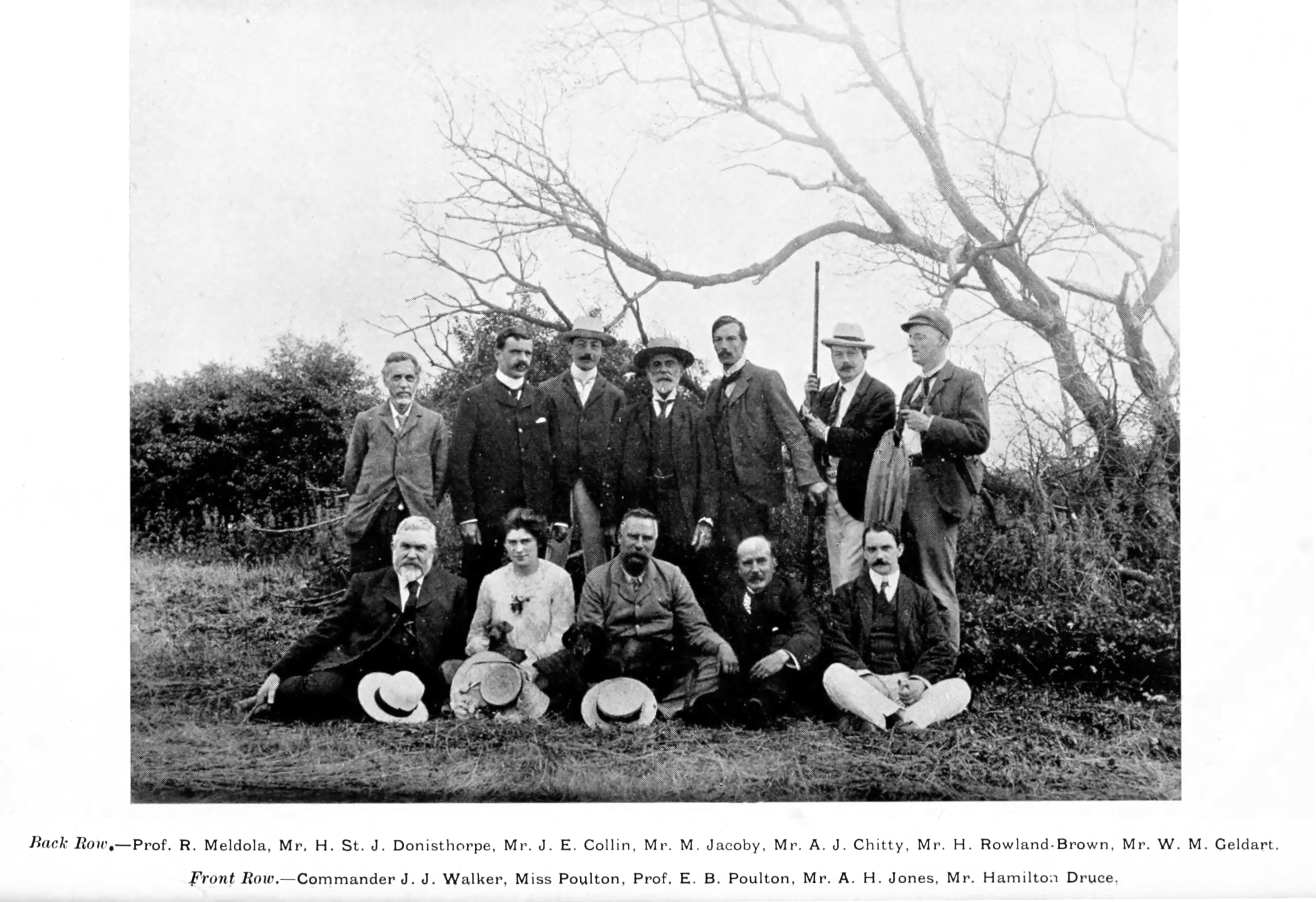
Collin with the Entomological Society in 1904 (standing, 3rd from left)

James Edward Collin (16 March 1876, Kirtling – 16 September 1968) was an English entomologist who specialised in Diptera.

He was the author of Empididae. British Flies, Volume 6. University Press, Cambridge (1961). This was the third volume in an uncompleted series begun by his uncle George Henry Verrall.

Collin wrote extensively on Diptera of most families of Diptera (excepting those in Nematocera). The specimens collected by Collin and his uncle Verrall are in the Hope Entomological Collections at the University of Oxford. The Oxford University Museum of Natural History's website provides a searchable database of the new species they described.

He was a Fellow of the Royal Entomological Society and its president 1927–1928.
