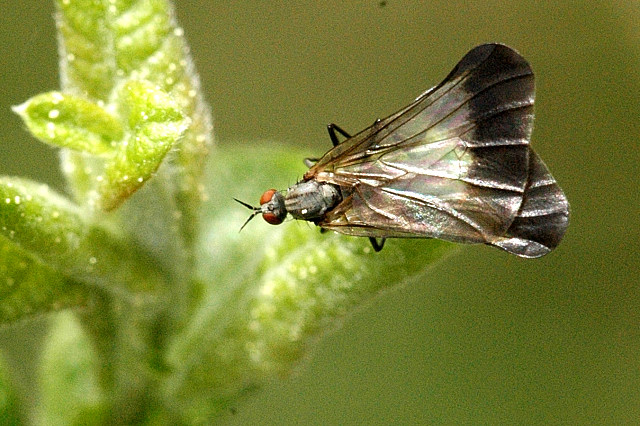
- Rhamphomyia marginata

Scientific classification
- Kingdom: Animalia
- Phylum: Arthropoda
- Clade: Pancrustacea
- Class: Insecta
- Order: Diptera
- Family: Empididae
- Subfamily: Empidinae
- Genus: Rhamphomyia; Meigen, 1822

Type species
- Empis sulcata Meigen, 1804

Diversity
- at least 620 species

Synonyms
- Rhamphomyza Zetterstedt, 1838

= Rhamphomyia =

Genus of flies

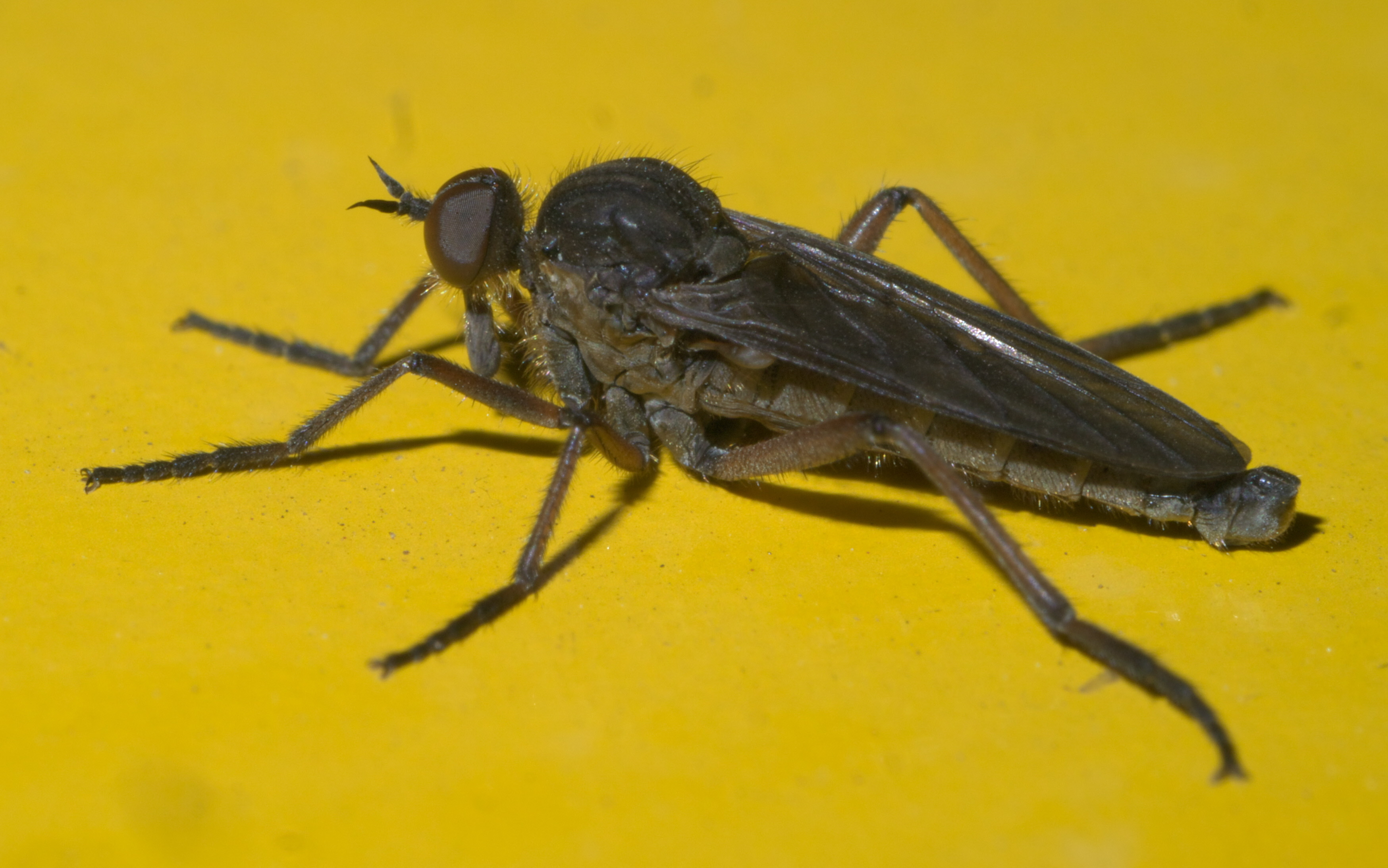

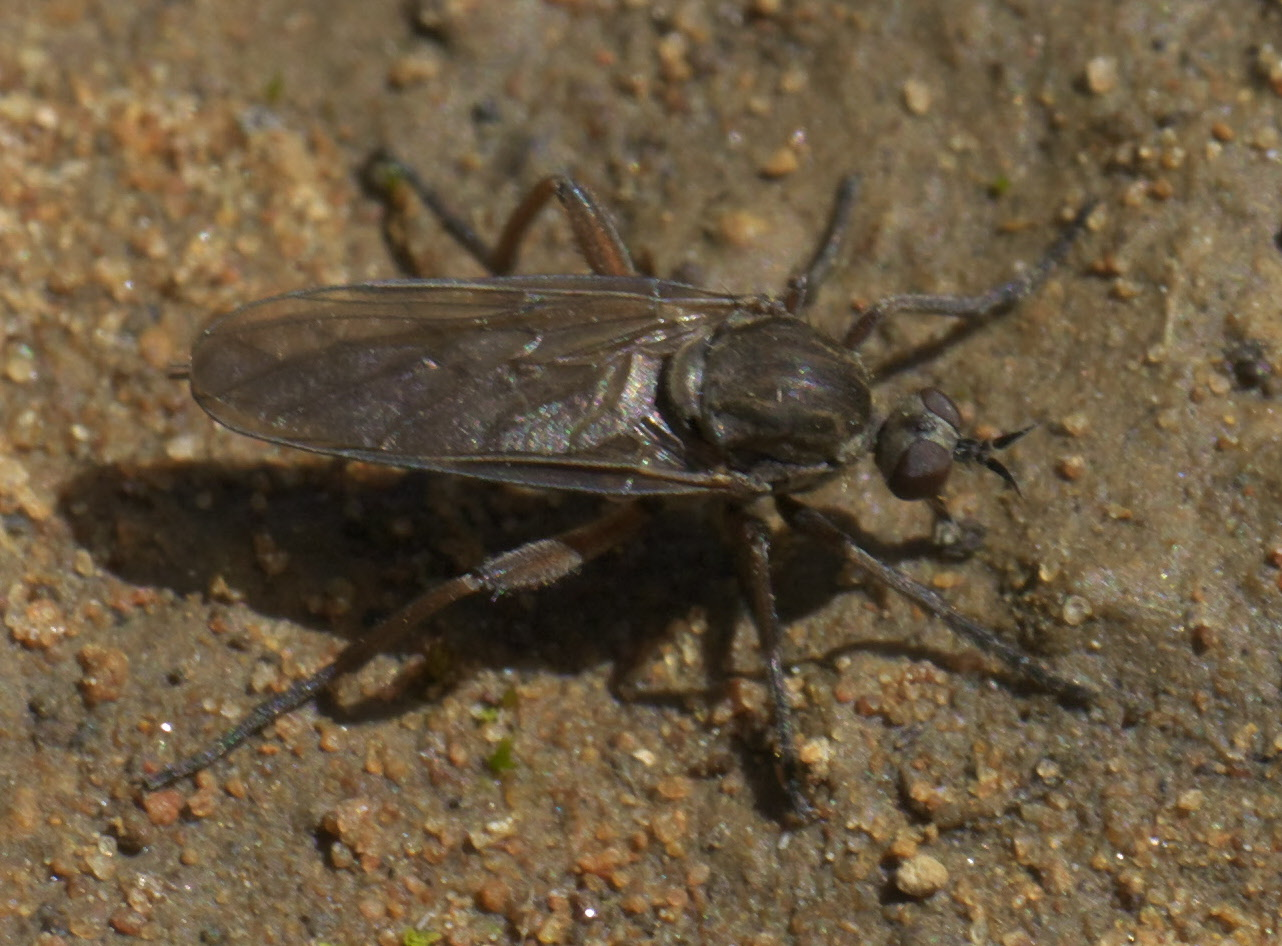

Rhamphomyia is a genus of dance flies, in the fly family Empididae. It contains more than 600 species in 8 subgenera.

== Species ==
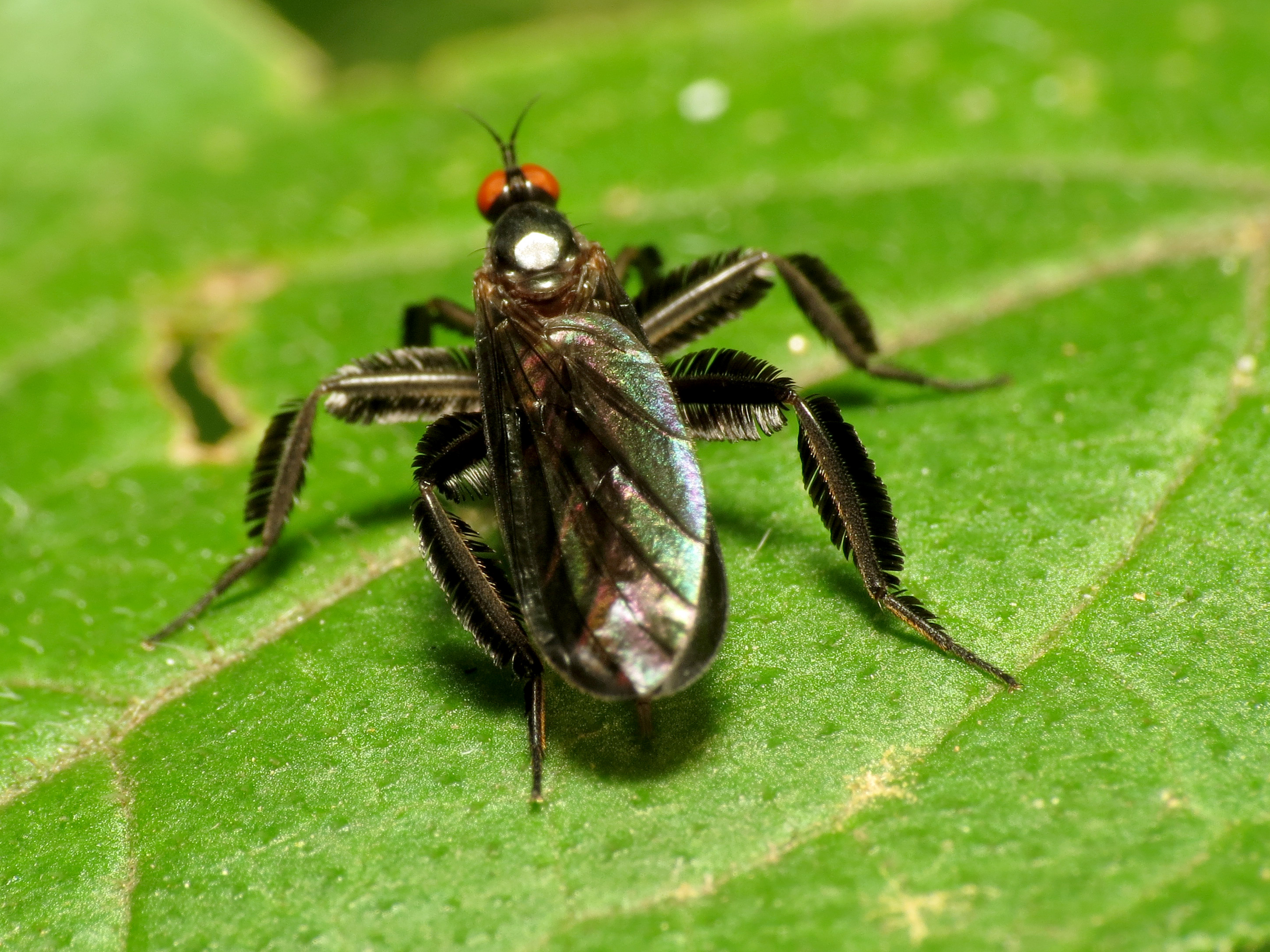
Rhamphomyia longicauda, species from North America

The species of Rhamphomyia are arranged into subgenera, as follows:

Aclonempis Collin, 1926
- Rhamphomyia albohirta Collin, 1926
- Rhamphomyia andalusiaca Strobl, 1899
- Rhamphomyia clypeata Macquart, 1834
- Rhamphomyia eupterota Loew, 1873
- Rhamphomyia galactoptera Strobl, 1893
- Rhamphomyia gibbifera Strobl, 1906
- Rhamphomyia leptopus Loew, 1873
- Rhamphomyia longipes (Meigen, 1804)
- Rhamphomyia mariobezzii Barták, 2001
- Rhamphomyia minor Oldenberg, 1922
- Rhamphomyia nox Oldenberg, 1917
- Rhamphomyia nubes (Collin, 1969)
- Rhamphomyia umbripes Becker, 1887
Amydroneura Collin, 1926
- Rhamphomyia bipila Strobl, 1909
- Rhamphomyia claripennis Oldenberg, 1922
- Rhamphomyia crassicauda Strobl, 1893
- Rhamphomyia erythrophthalma Meigen, 1830
- Rhamphomyia gibba (Fallén, 1816)
- Rhamphomyia hirsutipes Collin, 1926
- Rhamphomyia pseudogibba Strobl, 1910
Eorhamphomyia
- Rhamphomyia shewelli Sinclair, Vajda, Saigusa & Shamshev, 2019
Holoclera Schiner, 1860
- Rhamphomyia biserialis (Collin, 1960)
- Rhamphomyia bistriata Strobl, 1910
- Rhamphomyia caliginosa Collin, 1926
- Rhamphomyia culicina (Fallén, 1816)
- Rhamphomyia flava (Fallén, 1816)
- Rhamphomyia flaviventris Macquart, 1827
- Rhamphomyia heterochroma Bezzi, 1898
- Rhamphomyia lamellata Collin, 1926
- Rhamphomyia morenae Strobl, 1899
- Rhamphomyia nigripennis (Fabricius, 1794)
- Rhamphomyia sciarina (Fallén, 1816)
- Rhamphomyia trigemina Oldenberg, 1927
- Rhamphomyia umbripennis Meigen, 1822
- Rhamphomyia variabilis (Fallén, 1816)
Lundstroemiella Frey, 1922
- Rhamphomyia aterrima Frey, 1922
- Rhamphomyia australis Frey, 1922
- Rhamphomyia brevistylata Oldenberg, 1927
- Rhamphomyia cervi Barták, 2006
- Rhamphomyia cimrmani Barták, 2006
- Rhamphomyia dalmatica Oldenberg, 1927
- Rhamphomyia dudai Oldenberg, 1927
- Rhamphomyia freyi Barták, 1984
- Rhamphomyia granadensis Chvála, 1981
- Rhamphomyia hybotina Zetterstedt, 1838
- Rhamphomyia kerteszi Oldenberg, 1927
- Rhamphomyia longefilata Strobl, 1906
- Rhamphomyia magellensis Frey, 1922
- Rhamphomyia nigripes Strobl, 1898
- Rhamphomyia rupestris Oldenberg, 1927
- Rhamphomyia sphenoptera Loew, 1873
- Rhamphomyia speighti Barták, 2006
- Rhamphomyia strobli Barták, 1985
- Rhamphomyia tumiditarsis Oldenberg, 1917
Megacyttarus Bigot, 1880
- Rhamphomyia anomala Oldenberg, 1915
- Rhamphomyia anomalina Zetterstedt, 1838
- Rhamphomyia anomalipennis Meigen, 1822
- Rhamphomyia crassirostris (Fallén, 1816)
- Rhamphomyia gufitar Frey, 1922
- Rhamphomyia maculipennis Zetterstedt, 1842
- Rhamphomyia nodipes (Fallén, 1816)
- Rhamphomyia paradoxa Wahlberg, 1844
- Rhamphomyia poissoni (Trehen, 1966)

Pararhamphomyia Frey, 1922
- Rhamphomyia aethiops Zetterstedt, 1838
- Rhamphomyia albidiventris Strobl, 1898
- Rhamphomyia albipennis (Fallén, 1816)
- Rhamphomyia albissima Frey, 1913
- Rhamphomyia albitarsis Collin, 1926
- Rhamphomyia alpina Zetterstedt, 1838
- Rhamphomyia amoena Loew, 1840
- Rhamphomyia anfractuosa Bezzi, 1904
- Rhamphomyia angulifera Frey, 1913
- Rhamphomyia aperta Zetterstedt, 1859
- Rhamphomyia atra Meigen, 1822
- Rhamphomyia barbata (Macquart, 1823)
- Rhamphomyia breviventris Frey, 1913
- Rhamphomyia caesia Meigen, 1822
- Rhamphomyia caudata Zetterstedt, 1838
- Rhamphomyia chibinensis Frey, 1922
- Rhamphomyia cribrata Oldenberg, 1927
- Rhamphomyia curvula Frey, 1913
- Rhamphomyia dentata Oldenberg, 1910
- Rhamphomyia fascipennis Zetterstedt, 1838
- Rhamphomyia filicauda Frey, 1950
- Rhamphomyia frigida Sinclair, Vajda, Saigusa & Shamshev, 2019
- Rhamphomyia fuscipennis Zetterstedt, 1838
- Rhamphomyia fuscula Zetterstedt, 1838
- Rhamphomyia geniculata Meigen, 1830
- Rhamphomyia griseola Zetterstedt, 1838
- Rhamphomyia helleni Frey, 1922
- Rhamphomyia hirtula Zetterstedt, 1842
- Rhamphomyia lamelliseta Ringdahl, 1928
- Rhamphomyia lapponica Frey, 1955
- Rhamphomyia lividiventris Zetterstedt, 1838
- Rhamphomyia lucidula Zetterstedt, 1842
- Rhamphomyia lymaniana Sinclair, Vajda, Saigusa & Shamshev, 2019
- Rhamphomyia marginata (Fabricius, 1787)
- Rhamphomyia micropyga Collin, 1926
- Rhamphomyia modesta Wahlberg, 1844
- Rhamphomyia murina Collin, 1926
- Rhamphomyia niveipennis Zetterstedt, 1838
- Rhamphomyia nudipes Oldenberg, 1927
- Rhamphomyia obscura Zetterstedt, 1838
- Rhamphomyia obscuripennis Meigen, 1830
- Rhamphomyia petervajdai Sinclair, Vajda, Saigusa & Shamshev, 2019
- Rhamphomyia physoprocta Frey, 1913
- Rhamphomyia pilifer Meigen, 1838
- Rhamphomyia plumifera Zetterstedt, 1838
- Rhamphomyia poplitea Wahlberg, 1844
- Rhamphomyia praestans Frey, 1913
- Rhamphomyia pusilla Zetterstedt, 1838
- Rhamphomyia sareptana Frey, 1950
- Rhamphomyia septentrionalis Sinclair, Vajda, Saigusa & Shamshev, 2019
- Rhamphomyia simplex Zetterstedt, 1849
- Rhamphomyia subglaucella Frey, 1922
- Rhamphomyia tarsata Meigen, 1822
- Rhamphomyia tenuiterfilata Becker, 1900
- Rhamphomyia tibiella Zetterstedt, 1842
- Rhamphomyia tipularia (Fallén, 1816)
- Rhamphomyia unguiculata Frey, 1913
Rhamphomyia Meigen, 1822
- Rhamphomyia albonigra Frey, 1950
- Rhamphomyia albosegmentata Zetterstedt, 1838
- Rhamphomyia anthracina Meigen, 1822
- Rhamphomyia anthracinella Strobl, 1898
- Rhamphomyia argentata von Roder, 1887
- Rhamphomyia armimana Oldenberg, 1910
- Rhamphomyia aucta Oldenberg, 1917
- Rhamphomyia basispinosa Frey, 1950
- Rhamphomyia beckeriella Chvála, 1985
- Rhamphomyia bellinosetosa Barták, 2007
- Rhamphomyia biroi Bezzi, 1908
- Rhamphomyia brevipila Oldenberg, 1922
- Rhamphomyia caeca Collin, 1933
- Rhamphomyia candidula Collin, 1933
- Rhamphomyia chionoptera Bezzi, 1904
- Rhamphomyia cinerascens (Meigen, 1804)
- Rhamphomyia coracina Zetterstedt, 1849
- Rhamphomyia crassimana Strobl, 1898
- Rhamphomyia crinita Becker, 1887
- Rhamphomyia curvinervis Oldenberg, 1915
- Rhamphomyia czizeki Barták, 1982
- Rhamphomyia discoidalis Becker, 1889
- Rhamphomyia dorsata Becker, 1915
- Rhamphomyia eminens Collin, 1933
- Rhamphomyia erecta Barták, 1998
- Rhamphomyia galbanata Collin, 1933
- Rhamphomyia gracilitarsis Frey, 1950
- Rhamphomyia hambergi Frey, 1916
- Rhamphomyia hercynica Oldenberg, 1927
- Rhamphomyia hirtimana Oldenberg, 1922
- Rhamphomyia hungarica (Weber, 1969)
- Rhamphomyia ignobilis Zetterstedt, 1859
- Rhamphomyia interserta Collin, 1933
- Rhamphomyia janovensis Barták, 1981
- Rhamphomyia kreischi Barták, 1998
- Rhamphomyia laevipes (Fallén, 1816)
- Rhamphomyia latifrons Frey, 1913
- Rhamphomyia lautereri Barták, 1981
- Rhamphomyia lindneri Barták, 1998
- Rhamphomyia loewi Nowicki, 1868
- Rhamphomyia longicauda Loew, 1861
- Rhamphomyia longirostris (Lindner, 1972)
- Rhamphomyia luridipennis Nowicki, 1868
- Rhamphomyia melania Becker, 1887
- Rhamphomyia micans Oldenberg, 1915
- Rhamphomyia mollis Collin, 1933
- Rhamphomyia montana Oldenberg, 1915
- Rhamphomyia morio Zetterstedt, 1838
- Rhamphomyia nevadensis Lindner, 1962
- Rhamphomyia nigrita Zetterstedt, 1838
- Rhamphomyia nigromaculata von Roser, 1840
- Rhamphomyia nitidolineata Frey, 1913
- Rhamphomyia nitidula Zetterstedt, 1842
- Rhamphomyia nubigena Bezzi, 1904
- Rhamphomyia palmeni Frey, 1913
- Rhamphomyia parvicellulata Frey, 1922
- Rhamphomyia piedmontensis Barták, 2007
- Rhamphomyia plumipes (Meigen, 1804)
- Rhamphomyia pokornyi Bezzi, 1904
- Rhamphomyia ponti Barták, 2007
- Rhamphomyia reflexa Zetterstedt, 1838
- Rhamphomyia saintbaumensis (Meigen, 1804)
- Rhamphomyia sanctimauritii Becker, 1887
- Rhamphomyia scitula Frey, 1922
- Rhamphomyia sellacrinita Barták, 2007
- Rhamphomyia seposita Collin, 1933
- Rhamphomyia serpentata Loew, 1856
- Rhamphomyia siebecki Strobl, 1898
- Rhamphomyia spinipes (Fallén, 1816)
- Rhamphomyia spinosipes Oldenberg, 1915
- Rhamphomyia stigmosa Macquart, 1827
- Rhamphomyia subcinarescens Collin, 1926
- Rhamphomyia subdolomitica Barták, 1981
- Rhamphomyia sulcata (Meigen, 1804)
- Rhamphomyia sulcatella Collin, 1926
- Rhamphomyia sulcatina Collin, 1926
- Rhamphomyia tibialis Meigen, 1822
- Rhamphomyia tristriolata Nowicki, 1868
- Rhamphomyia ursina Oldenberg, 1915
- Rhamphomyia vesiculosa (Fallén, 1816)
- Rhamphomyia wagneri Barták, 1998
incertae sedis
- Rhamphomyia albogeniculata von Roser, 1840
- Rhamphomyia nasoni Coquillett, 1895

== Images ==
- images at Barcode of Life Data System

== See also ==
- List of Rhamphomyia species
