= Rhamphomyia brevipila =

Scientific classification
- Kingdom: Animalia
- Phylum: Arthropoda
- Clade: Pancrustacea
- Class: Insecta
- Order: Diptera
- Family: Empididae
- Genus: Rhamphomyia
- Subgenus: Rhamphomyia
- Species: R. brevipila

Binomial name
- Rhamphomyia brevipila Oldenberg, 1922

Synonyms
- Rhamphomyia teriolensis Frey, 1953

Species of insect

Rhamphomyia brevipila is a species of dance flies, in the fly family Empididae. It is included in the subgenus Rhamphomyia.
