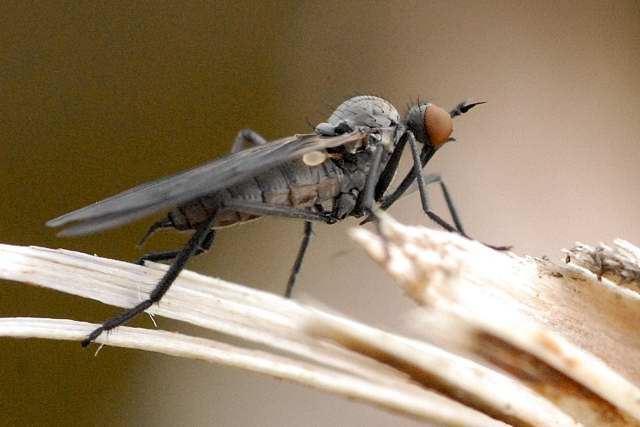
- Rhamphomyia albidiventris

Scientific classification
- Kingdom: Animalia
- Phylum: Arthropoda
- Class: Insecta
- Order: Diptera
- Family: Empididae
- Genus: Rhamphomyia
- Subgenus: Pararhamphomyia
- Species: R. albidiventris

Binomial name
- Rhamphomyia albidiventris Strobl, 1898

Synonyms
- Rhamphomyia woldstedti Frey, 1913

= Rhamphomyia albidiventris =

Species of insect

Rhamphomyia albidiventris is a species of dance flies, in the fly family Empididae. It is included in the subgenus Pararhamphomyia. It has a limited distribution. It has been recorded from Great Britain, Germany, Austria, Slovakia, Bosnia, Finland and central Russia.
