= Calohilara elegans =

Scientific classification
- Kingdom: Animalia
- Phylum: Arthropoda
- Class: Insecta
- Order: Diptera
- Family: Empididae
- Subfamily: Empidinae
- Genus: Calohilara
- Species: C. elegans

Binomial name
- Calohilara elegans (Frey, 1952)

Synonyms
- Hilara elegans Frey, 1952

Species of fly

Calohilara elegans is a species of fly in the family Empididae endemic to Myanmar.
