= Chamaesyrphus =

Scientific classification
- Kingdom: Animalia
- Phylum: Arthropoda
- Class: Insecta
- Order: Diptera
- Family: Syrphidae
- Subfamily: Eristalinae
- Tribe: Rhingiini
- Genus: Chamaesyrphus; Mik, 1895

Genus of flies

Chamaesyrphus is a genus hoverflies, from the family Syrphidae, in the order Diptera. Small yellow and black flies. Antennae with segment 3 large and almost evenly rounded, the arista only slightly thickened towards base and inserted before the actual anterior dorsal tip of the segment. In contrast to Pelecocera.

== Species ==
- Chamaesyrphus caledonicus Collin, 1940
- Chamaesyrphus lusitanicus Mik, 1898
- Chamaesyrphus nigricornis Santos Abréu, 1924
- Chamaesyrphus pruinosomaculatus (Strobl, 1906)
- Chamaesyrphus scaevoides (Fallén, 1817)
