= Rhamphomyia scitula =

Scientific classification
- Kingdom: Animalia
- Phylum: Arthropoda
- Class: Insecta
- Order: Diptera
- Family: Empididae
- Genus: Rhamphomyia
- Subgenus: Rhamphomyia
- Species: R. scitula

Binomial name
- Rhamphomyia scitula Frey, 1922

Species of fly

Rhamphomyia scitula is a species of dance flies, in the fly family Empididae.
