= Rhamphomyia palmeni =

Scientific classification
- Kingdom: Animalia
- Phylum: Arthropoda
- Class: Insecta
- Order: Diptera
- Family: Empididae
- Genus: Rhamphomyia
- Subgenus: Rhamphomyia
- Species: R. palmeni

Binomial name
- Rhamphomyia palmeni Frey, 1913

Species of insect

Rhamphomyia palmeni is a species of dance flies, in the fly family Empididae. It is included in the subgenus Rhamphomyia.
