= Pelecocera escorialensis =

Scientific classification
- Kingdom: Animalia
- Phylum: Arthropoda
- Class: Insecta
- Order: Diptera
- Family: Syrphidae
- Genus: Pelecocera
- Species: P. escorialensis

Binomial name
- Pelecocera escorialensis Strobl, 1909

Species of fly

Pelecocera escorialensis is a species of hoverfly in the family Syrphidae.

== Distribution ==
Spain.
