= Rhamphomyia dalmatica =

Scientific classification
- Kingdom: Animalia
- Phylum: Arthropoda
- Class: Insecta
- Order: Diptera
- Family: Empididae
- Genus: Rhamphomyia
- Subgenus: Lundstroemiella
- Species: R. dalmatica

Binomial name
- Rhamphomyia dalmatica Oldenberg, 1927

Species of fly

Rhamphomyia dalmatica is a species of dance flies, in the fly family Empididae. It is included in the subgenus Lundstroemiella.
