= Rhamphomyia claripennis =

Scientific classification
- Kingdom: Animalia
- Phylum: Arthropoda
- Class: Insecta
- Order: Diptera
- Family: Empididae
- Genus: Rhamphomyia
- Subgenus: Amydroneura
- Species: R. claripennis

Binomial name
- Rhamphomyia claripennis Oldenberg, 1922

Species of fly

Rhamphomyia claripennis is a species of dance flies, in the fly family Empididae. It is include in the subgenus Amydroneura of the genus Rhamphomyia.
