= Rhamphomyia bipila =

Scientific classification
- Kingdom: Animalia
- Phylum: Arthropoda
- Clade: Pancrustacea
- Class: Insecta
- Order: Diptera
- Family: Empididae
- Genus: Rhamphomyia
- Subgenus: Amydroneura
- Species: R. bipila

Binomial name
- Rhamphomyia bipila Strobl, 1909

Species of fly

The Rhamphomyia bipila is a species of dance flies in the fly family Empididae. It is included in the subgenus Amydroneura of the genus Rhamphomyia.
