= Rhamphomyia dudai =

Scientific classification
- Kingdom: Animalia
- Phylum: Arthropoda
- Clade: Pancrustacea
- Class: Insecta
- Order: Diptera
- Family: Empididae
- Genus: Rhamphomyia
- Subgenus: Lundstroemiella
- Species: R. dudai

Binomial name
- Rhamphomyia dudai Oldenberg, 1927

Species of fly

Rhamphomyia dudai is a species of dance flies, in the fly family Empididae. It is included in the subgenus Lundstroemiella.
