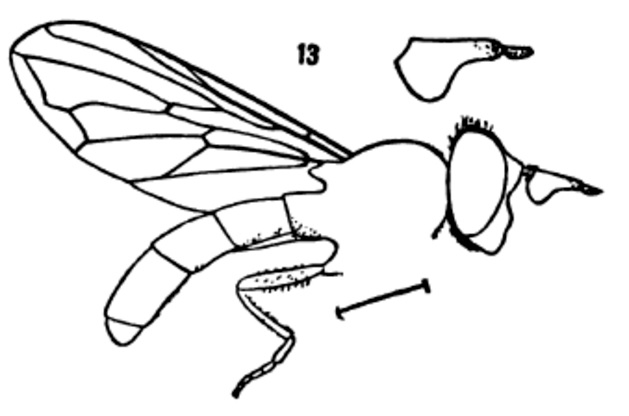

Scientific classification
- Kingdom: Animalia
- Phylum: Arthropoda
- Class: Insecta
- Order: Diptera
- Family: Syrphidae
- Subfamily: Eristalinae
- Tribe: Rhingiini
- Genus: Pelecocera; Meigen, 1822

Type species
- Pelecocera tricincta Meigen, 1822

= Pelecocera =

Genus of flies

Pelecocera is a Holarctic genus of Hoverflies, from the family Syrphidae, in the order Diptera. Antennae with segment 3 a half moon shape (flat above, only rounded below) or triangular, in the female the arista very thick, spike-like, inserted at the anterior extremity of segment 3. They are small black and yellow or orange flies found mainly on heaths.

== Species ==
- Pelecocera apichaetus (Curran, 1923)
- Pelecocera escorialensis Strobl, 1909
- Pelecocera latifrons Loew, 1856
- Pelecocera lugubris Perris, 1839
- Pelecocera pergandei (Williston, 1884)
- Pelecocera scaevoides (Fallén, 1817) now Chamaesyrphus
- Pelecocera tricincta Meigen, 1822
- Pelecocera willistoni Snow, 1895
