= Rhamphomyia chibinensis =

Scientific classification
- Kingdom: Animalia
- Phylum: Arthropoda
- Clade: Pancrustacea
- Class: Insecta
- Order: Diptera
- Family: Empididae
- Genus: Rhamphomyia
- Subgenus: Pararhamphomyia
- Species: R. chibinensis

Binomial name
- Rhamphomyia chibinensis Frey, 1922

Species of insect

Rhamphomyia chibinensis is a species of dance flies, in the fly family Empididae. It is included in the subgenus Pararhamphomyia.
