= Rhamphomyia aucta =

Scientific classification
- Kingdom: Animalia
- Phylum: Arthropoda
- Clade: Pancrustacea
- Class: Insecta
- Order: Diptera
- Family: Empididae
- Genus: Rhamphomyia
- Subgenus: Rhamphomyia
- Species: R. aucta

Binomial name
- Rhamphomyia aucta Oldenberg, 1917

Species of insect

Rhamphomyia aucta is a species of dance flies, in the fly family Empididae. It is included in the subgenus Rhamphomyia.
