= Calohilara =

Scientific classification
- Kingdom: Animalia
- Phylum: Arthropoda
- Class: Insecta
- Order: Diptera
- Family: Empididae
- Subfamily: Empidinae
- Genus: Calohilara; Frey, 1952

Type species
- Hilara (Calohilara) elegans Frey, 1952

Genus of flies

Calohilara is a genus of flies in the family Empididae. It was originally considered a subgenus of Hilaria, but raised to genus status due to morphological features such as "male eyes narrowly separated on the face with the enlarged anterior ommatidia, male and female wings with distinct dark markings and veins R2+3 strongly bent.

The mitochondrial DNA of Calohilara tibetensis was sequenced in 2021. It consists of 15,354 base pairs, divided between 13 protein-coding genes, two ribosomal RNAs, and 22 transfer RNAs. It is similar to other mitochondrial DNA of the family Empididae, and the nucleotide composition also strongly uses adenine and thymine (which together make up 77.4% of the total).

== Species ==
- Calohilara elegans (Frey, 1952)
- Calohilara kambaitiensis (Frey, 1952)
- Calohilara pulchella (Frey, 1952)
- Calohilara tibetensis Ding, He, Lin & Yang, 2020, discovered in Mêdog County, Tibet
