= Rhamphomyia curvinervis =

Scientific classification
- Kingdom: Animalia
- Phylum: Arthropoda
- Clade: Pancrustacea
- Class: Insecta
- Order: Diptera
- Family: Empididae
- Genus: Rhamphomyia
- Subgenus: Rhamphomyia
- Species: R. curvinervis

Binomial name
- Rhamphomyia curvinervis Oldenberg, 1915

Species of insect

Rhamphomyia curvinervis is a species of dance flies, in the fly family Empididae. It is included in the subgenus Rhamphomyia.
