= Rhamphomyia anomala =

Scientific classification
- Kingdom: Animalia
- Phylum: Arthropoda
- Clade: Pancrustacea
- Class: Insecta
- Order: Diptera
- Family: Empididae
- Genus: Rhamphomyia
- Subgenus: Megacyttarus
- Species: R. anomala

Binomial name
- Rhamphomyia anomala Oldenberg, 1915

Species of fly

Rhamphomyia anomala is a species of dance flies, in the fly family Empididae.
