= Rhamphomyia hercynica =

Scientific classification
- Kingdom: Animalia
- Phylum: Arthropoda
- Class: Insecta
- Order: Diptera
- Family: Empididae
- Genus: Rhamphomyia
- Subgenus: Rhamphomyia
- Species: R. hercynica

Binomial name
- Rhamphomyia hercynica Oldenberg, 1927

Species of insect

Rhamphomyia hercynica is a species of dance flies, in the fly family Empididae. It is included in the subgenus Rhamphomyia.
