= Rhamphomyia pseudogibba =

Scientific classification
- Kingdom: Animalia
- Phylum: Arthropoda
- Class: Insecta
- Order: Diptera
- Family: Empididae
- Genus: Rhamphomyia
- Subgenus: Amydroneura
- Species: R. pseudogibba

Binomial name
- Rhamphomyia pseudogibba Strobl, 1910

Species of fly

Rhamphomyia pseudogibba is a species of dance flies, in the fly family Empididae. It is include in the subgenus Amydroneura of the genus Rhamphomyia.
