= Rhamphomyia crassicauda =

Scientific classification
- Kingdom: Animalia
- Phylum: Arthropoda
- Clade: Pancrustacea
- Class: Insecta
- Order: Diptera
- Family: Empididae
- Genus: Rhamphomyia
- Subgenus: Amydroneura
- Species: R. crassicauda

Binomial name
- Rhamphomyia crassicauda Strobl, 1893

Species of fly

Rhamphomyia crassicauda is a species of dance flies, in the fly family Empididae. It is include in the subgenus Amydroneura of the genus Rhamphomyia.
