= Rhamphomyia minor =

Scientific classification
- Kingdom: Animalia
- Phylum: Arthropoda
- Class: Insecta
- Order: Diptera
- Family: Empididae
- Genus: Rhamphomyia
- Subgenus: Aclonempis
- Species: R. minor

Binomial name
- Rhamphomyia minor Oldenberg, 1922

Species of fly

Rhamphomyia minor is a species of dance flies, in the fly family Empididae. It is included in the subgenus Aclonempis.
