= Rhamphomyia praestans =

Scientific classification
- Kingdom: Animalia
- Phylum: Arthropoda
- Class: Insecta
- Order: Diptera
- Family: Empididae
- Genus: Rhamphomyia
- Subgenus: Pararhamphomyia
- Species: R. praestans

Binomial name
- Rhamphomyia praestans Frey, 1913

Species of insect

Rhamphomyia praestans is a species of dance flies, in the fly family Empididae. It is included in the subgenus Pararhamphomyia.
