= Rhamphomyia trigemina =

Scientific classification
- Kingdom: Animalia
- Phylum: Arthropoda
- Class: Insecta
- Order: Diptera
- Family: Empididae
- Genus: Rhamphomyia
- Subgenus: Holoclera
- Species: R. trigemina

Binomial name
- Rhamphomyia trigemina Oldenberg, 1927

Species of fly

Rhamphomyia trigemina is a species of dance flies, in the fly family Empididae.
