= Rhamphomyia albissima =

Scientific classification
- Kingdom: Animalia
- Phylum: Arthropoda
- Clade: Pancrustacea
- Class: Insecta
- Order: Diptera
- Family: Empididae
- Genus: Rhamphomyia
- Subgenus: Pararhamphomyia
- Species: R. albissima

Binomial name
- Rhamphomyia albissima Frey, 1913

Species of fly

Rhamphomyia albissima is a species of dance fly in the family Empididae. It is in the subgenus Rhamphomyia (Pararhamphomyia).
