= Rhamphomyia gibbifera =

Scientific classification
- Kingdom: Animalia
- Phylum: Arthropoda
- Clade: Pancrustacea
- Class: Insecta
- Order: Diptera
- Family: Empididae
- Genus: Rhamphomyia
- Subgenus: Aclonempis
- Species: R. gibbifera

Binomial name
- Rhamphomyia gibbifera Strobl, 1906

Species of fly

Rhamphomyia gibbifera is a species of dance flies, in the fly family Empididae. It is included in the subgenus Aclonempis.
