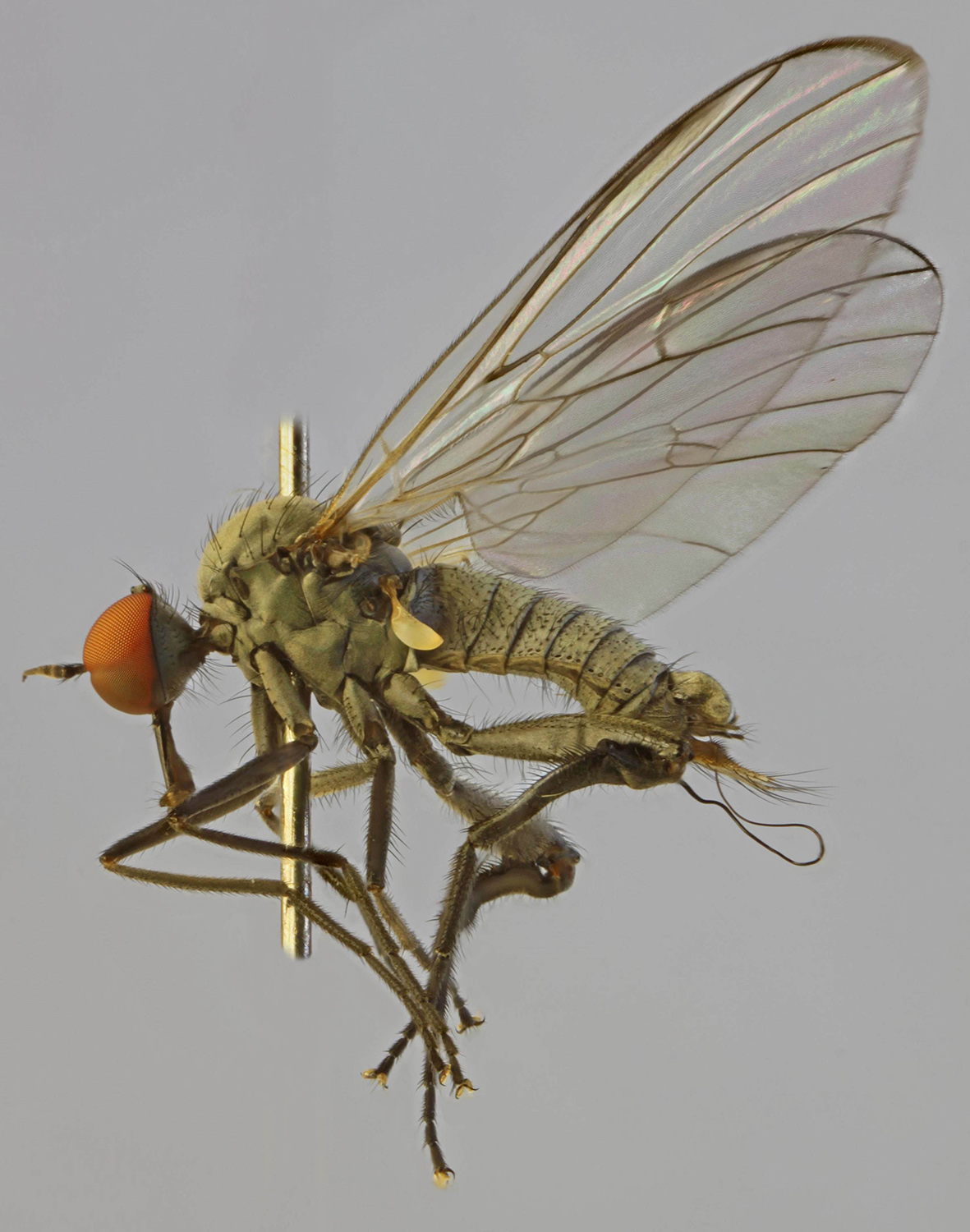
- Rhamphomyia pilifer North Wales

Scientific classification
- Kingdom: Animalia
- Phylum: Arthropoda
- Class: Insecta
- Order: Diptera
- Family: Empididae
- Genus: Rhamphomyia
- Subgenus: Pararhamphomyia
- Species: R. pilifer

Binomial name
- Rhamphomyia pilifer Meigen, 1838

Synonyms
- Rhamphomyia dentipes Zetterstedt, 1842

= Rhamphomyia pilifer =

Species of fly

Rhamphomyia pilifer is a species of dance flies, in the fly family Empididae. It is found in most of Europe, except the Balkan Peninsula and the Iberian Peninsula.

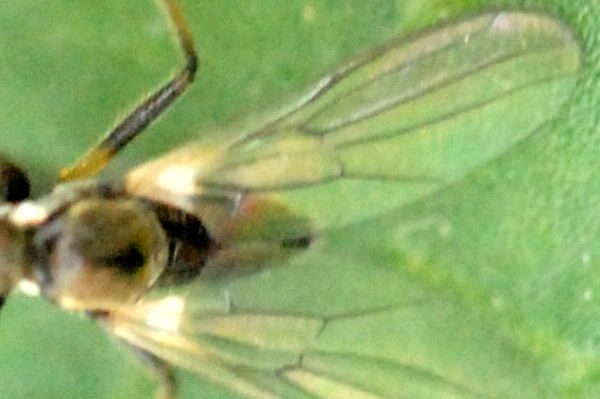
Rhamphomyia pilifer wing detail
