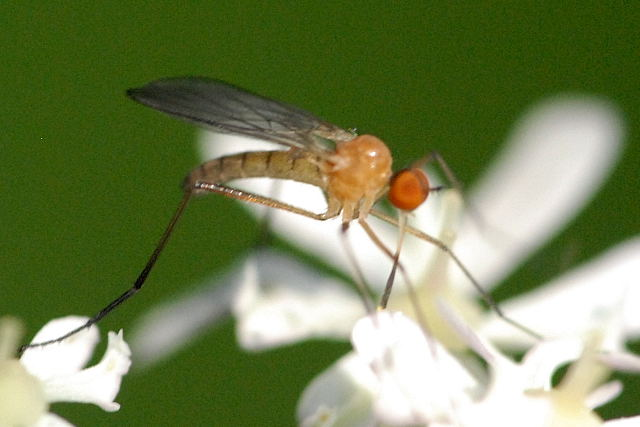

Scientific classification
- Kingdom: Animalia
- Phylum: Arthropoda
- Class: Insecta
- Order: Diptera
- Family: Empididae
- Genus: Rhamphomyia
- Subgenus: Holoclera
- Species: R. flava

Binomial name
- Rhamphomyia flava (Fallén, 1816)

Synonyms
- Empis flava Fallén, 1816; Rhamphomyia saniculae Curtis, 1834

= Rhamphomyia flava =

Species of fly

Rhamphomyia flava is a species of dance flies, in the fly family Empididae. It is found in most of Europe, except the Iberian Peninsula and most of the Balkan Peninsula.

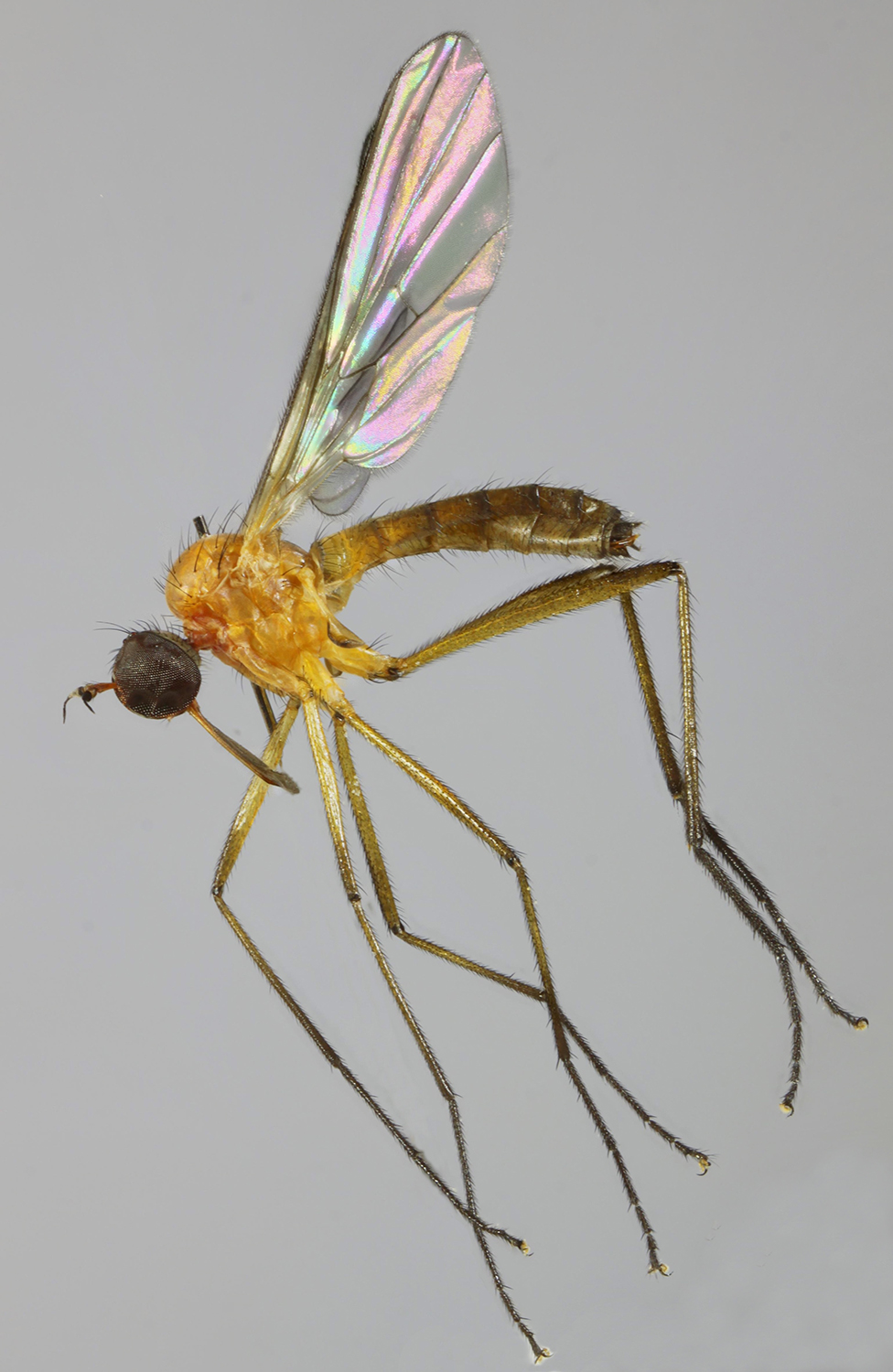
Rhamphomyia flava specimen North Wales
