= Rhamphomyia anomalipennis =

Scientific classification
- Kingdom: Animalia
- Phylum: Arthropoda
- Class: Insecta
- Order: Diptera
- Family: Empididae
- Genus: Rhamphomyia
- Subgenus: Megacyttarus
- Species: R. anomalipennis

Binomial name
- Rhamphomyia anomalipennis Meigen, 1822

Species of fly

Rhamphomyia anomalipennis is a species of dance fly, in the fly family Empididae. It is included in the subgenus Megacyttarus of the genus Rhamphomyia.
