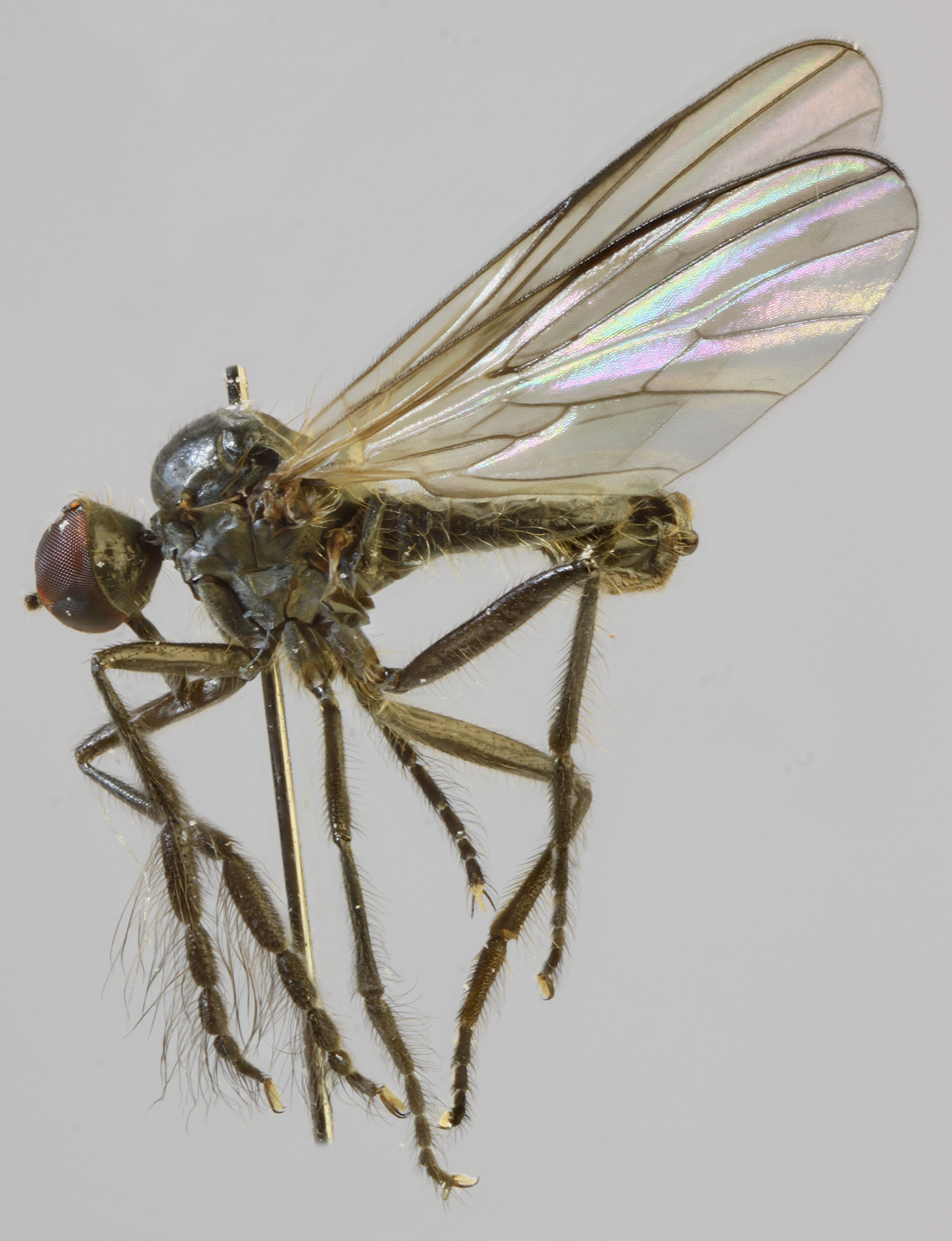
- Rhamphomyia hirsutipes North Wales

Scientific classification
- Kingdom: Animalia
- Phylum: Arthropoda
- Class: Insecta
- Order: Diptera
- Family: Empididae
- Genus: Rhamphomyia
- Subgenus: Amydroneura
- Species: R. hirsutipes

Binomial name
- Rhamphomyia hirsutipes Collin, 1926

= Rhamphomyia hirsutipes =

Species of fly

Rhamphomyia hirsutipes is a species of fly in the family Empididae. It is include in the subgenus Amydroneura of the genus Rhamphomyia. It is found in the Palearctic.
