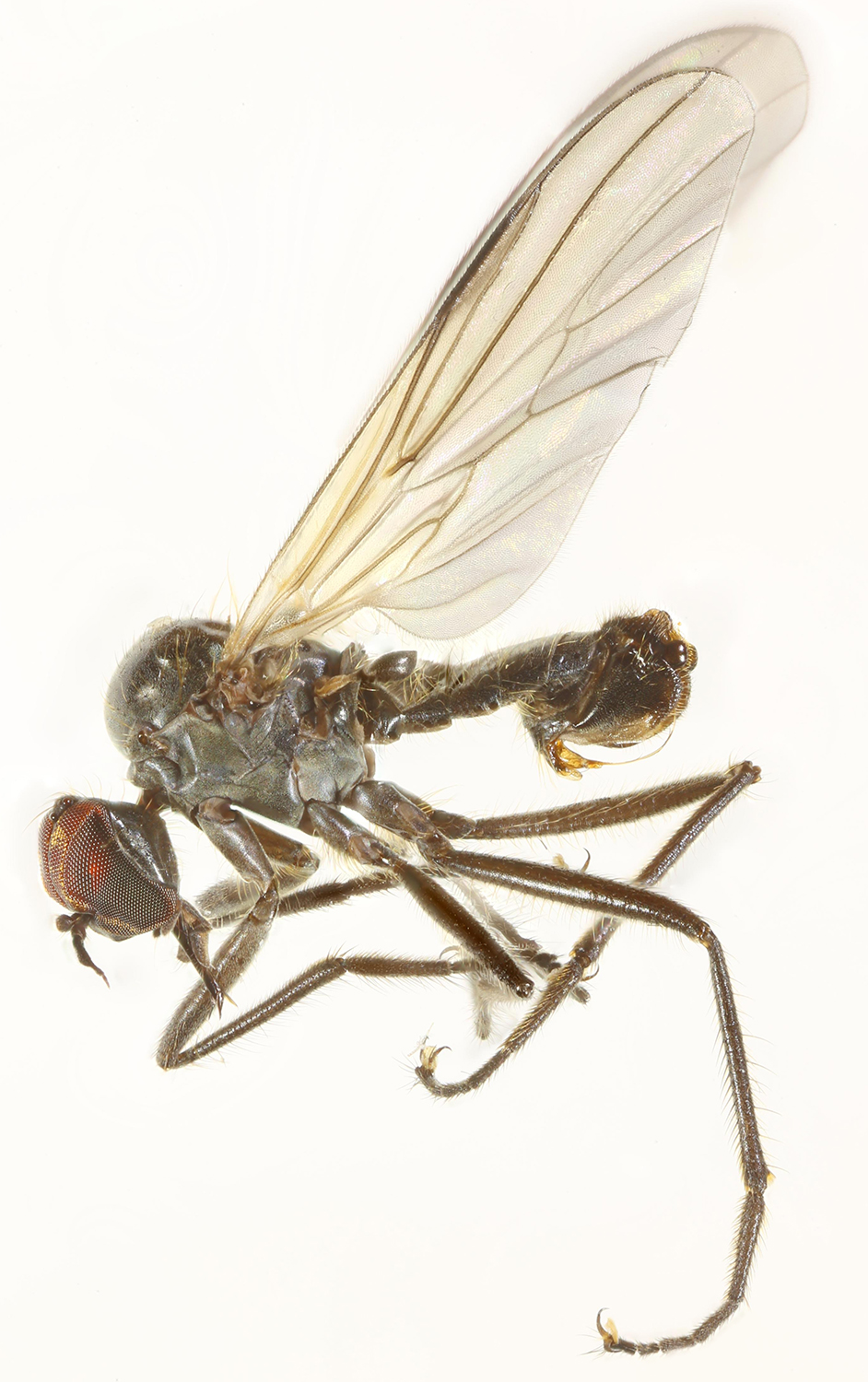
- Rhamphomyia erythrophthalma North Wales Long 3-3.5 mm.

Scientific classification
- Kingdom: Animalia
- Phylum: Arthropoda
- Class: Insecta
- Order: Diptera
- Family: Empididae
- Genus: Rhamphomyia
- Species: R. erythrophthalma

Binomial name
- Rhamphomyia erythrophthalma Meigen, 1830

= Rhamphomyia erythrophthalma =

Species of fly

Rhamphomyia erythrophthalma is a species of fly in the family Empididae. It is found in the Palearctic.
