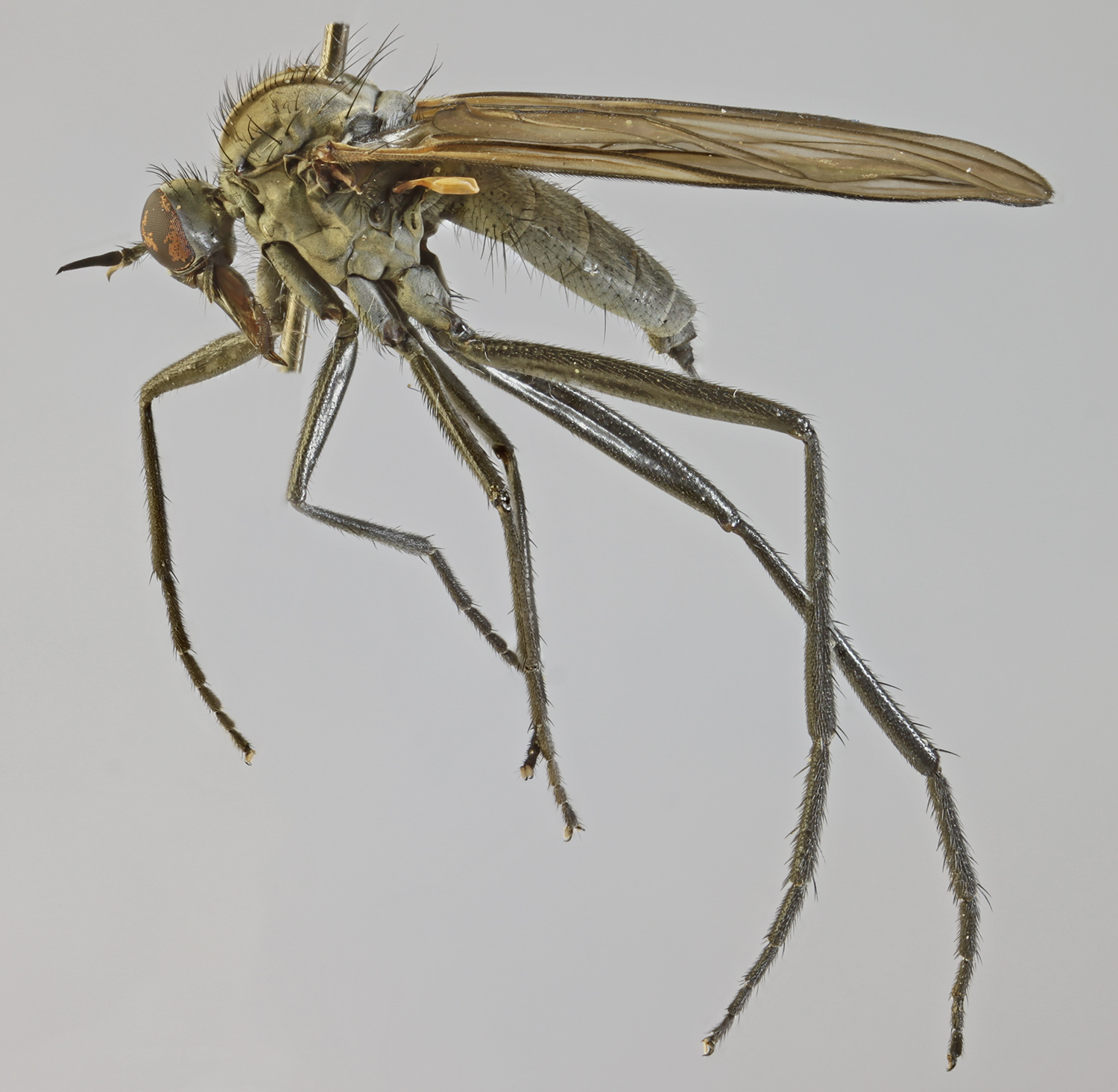
- Rhamphomyia stigmosa North Wales Long 5-6 mm.

Scientific classification
- Kingdom: Animalia
- Phylum: Arthropoda
- Class: Insecta
- Order: Diptera
- Family: Empididae
- Genus: Rhamphomyia
- Species: R. stigmosa

Binomial name
- Rhamphomyia stigmosa Macquart, 1827

= Rhamphomyia stigmosa =

Species of fly

Rhamphomyia stigmosa is a species of fly in the family Empididae. It is found in the Palearctic.
