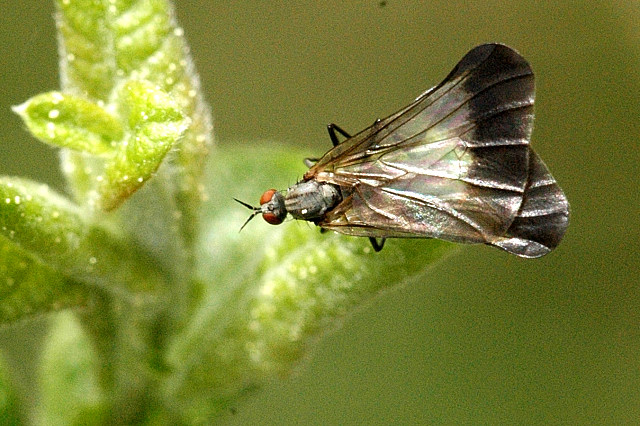

Scientific classification
- Kingdom: Animalia
- Phylum: Arthropoda
- Class: Insecta
- Order: Diptera
- Family: Empididae
- Genus: Rhamphomyia
- Subgenus: Pararhamphomyia
- Species: R. marginata

Binomial name
- Rhamphomyia marginata (Fabricius, 1787)

Synonyms
- Empis marginata Fabricius, 1787

= Rhamphomyia marginata =

Species of fly

Rhamphomyia marginata is a species of dance flies, in the fly family Empididae. It is found in Europe, from Great Britain east to Romania and from Fennoscandia south to France, Austria and Hungary.

This species is unusual, though not unique, as it is the females, and not the males that swarm.
