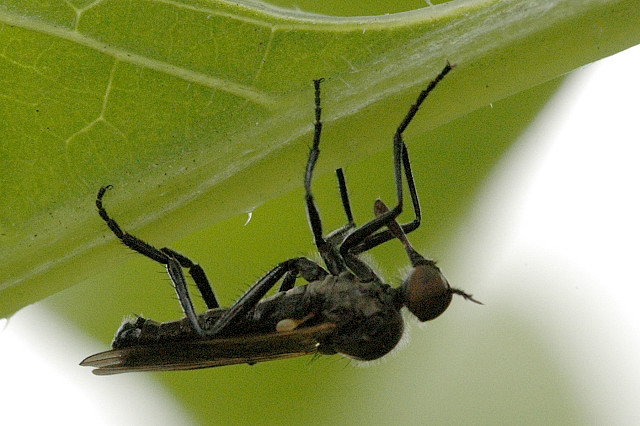

Scientific classification
- Kingdom: Animalia
- Phylum: Arthropoda
- Class: Insecta
- Order: Diptera
- Family: Empididae
- Genus: Rhamphomyia
- Subgenus: Megacyttarus
- Species: R. crassirostris

Binomial name
- Rhamphomyia crassirostris (Fallén, 1816)

Synonyms
- Empis crassirostris Fallén, 1816; Rhamphomyia nigripes Walker, 1851

= Rhamphomyia crassirostris =

Species of fly

Rhamphomyia crassirostris is a species of dance flies, in the fly family Empididae. It is found in most of Europe, east to Poland and Hungary. It is absent from Italy and the Balkan Peninsula.

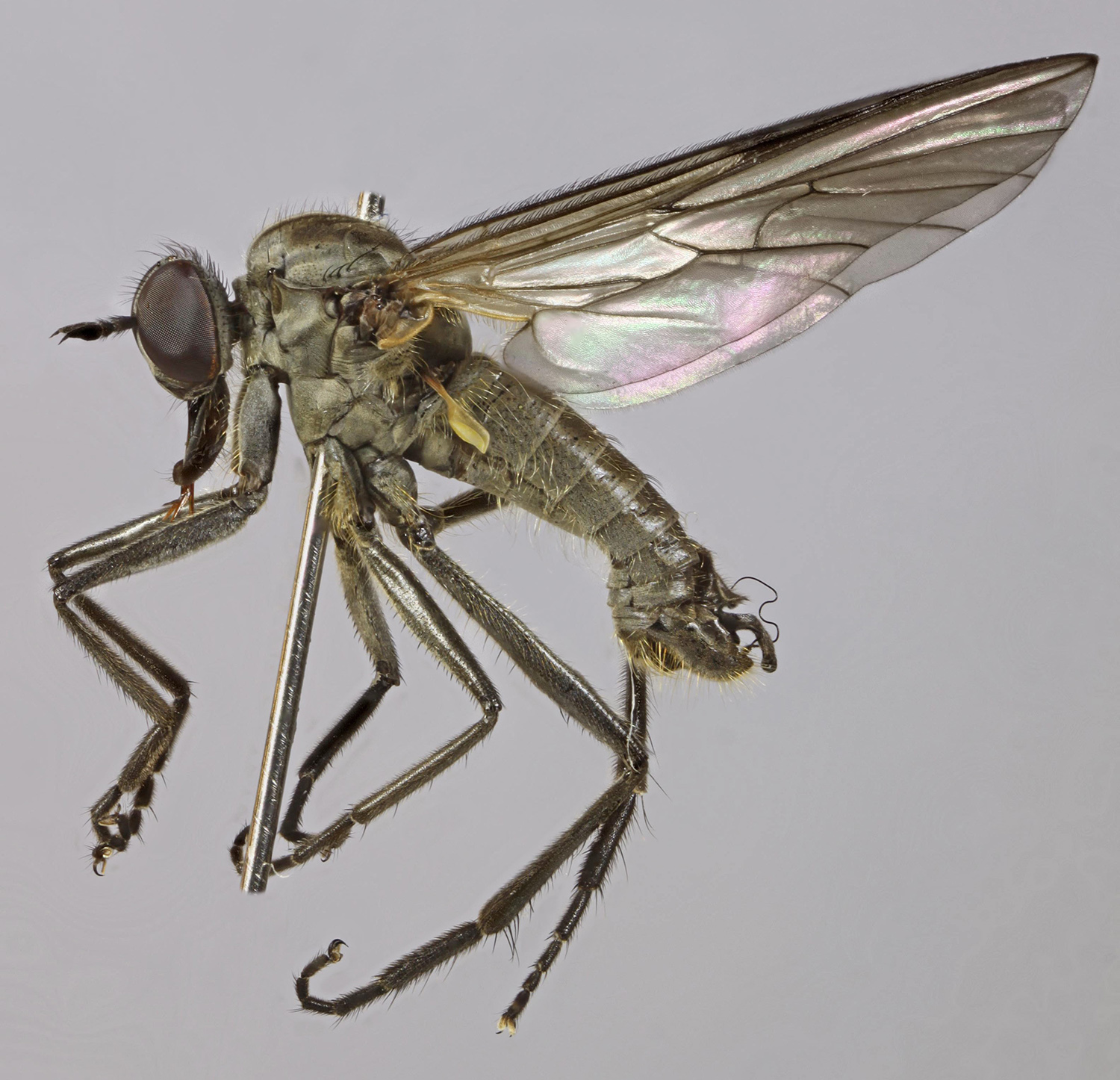
Rhamphomyia crassirostris specimen North Wales
