= Rhamphomyia caliginosa =

Scientific classification
- Kingdom: Animalia
- Phylum: Arthropoda
- Class: Insecta
- Order: Diptera
- Family: Empididae
- Genus: Rhamphomyia
- Subgenus: Holoclera
- Species: R. caliginosa

Binomial name
- Rhamphomyia caliginosa Collin, 1926

Species of fly

Rhamphomyia caliginosa is a species of dance flies, in the fly family Empididae. It is included in the subgenus Holoclera of the genus Rhamphomyia.
