= Rhamphomyia biserialis =

Scientific classification
- Kingdom: Animalia
- Phylum: Arthropoda
- Class: Insecta
- Order: Diptera
- Family: Empididae
- Genus: Rhamphomyia
- Subgenus: Holoclera
- Species: R. biserialis

Binomial name
- Rhamphomyia biserialis (Collin, 1960)

Species of fly

Rhamphomyia biserialis is a species of dance flies, in the fly family Empididae.
