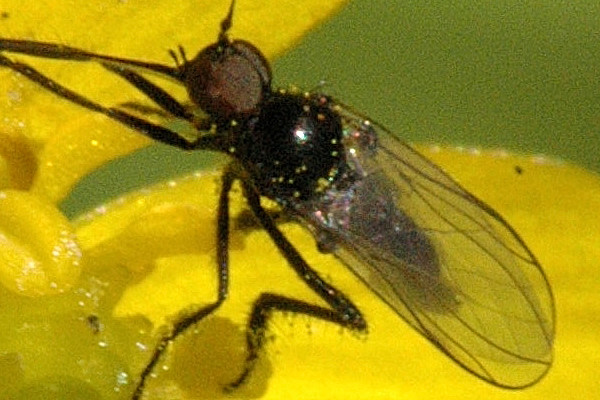

Scientific classification
- Kingdom: Animalia
- Phylum: Arthropoda
- Class: Insecta
- Order: Diptera
- Family: Empididae
- Genus: Rhamphomyia
- Subgenus: Holoclera
- Species: R. lamellata

Binomial name
- Rhamphomyia lamellata Collin, 1926

= Rhamphomyia lamellata =

Species of fly

Rhamphomyia lamellata is a species of dance flies, in the fly family Empididae. It is included in the subgenus Holoclera of the genus Rhamphomyia. It is found in Great Britain and Ireland, Germany, Switzerland, the Czech Republic, Slovakia and Hungary.
