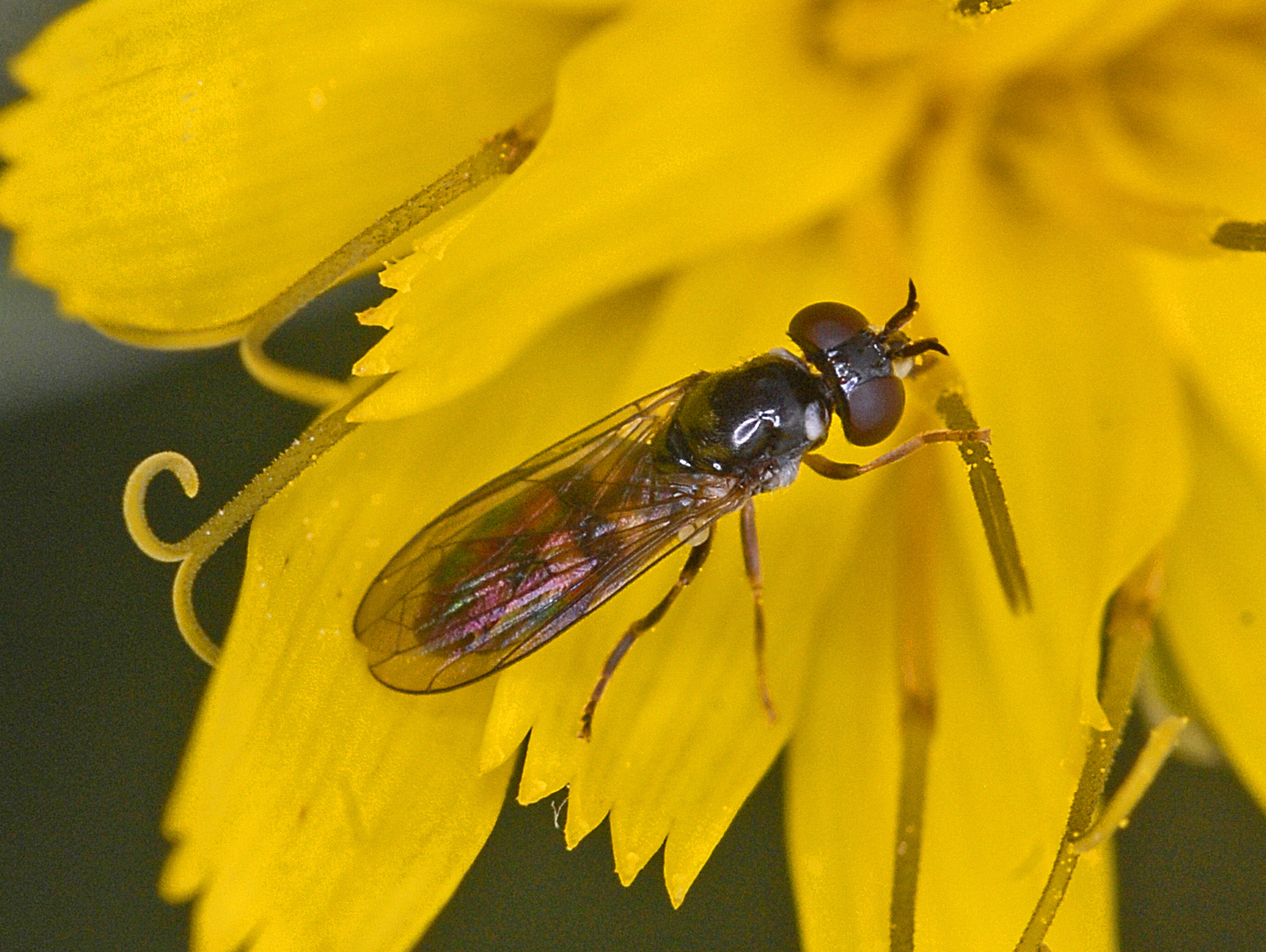
- Pelecocera tricincta, female

Scientific classification
- Kingdom: Animalia
- Phylum: Arthropoda
- Clade: Pancrustacea
- Class: Insecta
- Order: Diptera
- Family: Syrphidae
- Genus: Pelecocera
- Species: P. tricincta

Binomial name
- Pelecocera tricincta Meigen, 1822

= Pelecocera tricincta =

Species of fly

Pelecocera tricincta is a species of hoverfly, from the family Syrphidae.

== Description ==
Pelecocera tricincta is a small hoverfly reaching a length of 4–5 millimetres (0.16–0.20 in). It has a black scutellum, three black bands on the yellow abdomen and swollen triangular third antennal segments.

Adults can be found from June to October, when they visit yellow composites such as Hieracium, flowers of common tormentil (Potentilla erecta), heather (Calluna) and cross-leaved heath (Erica tetralix).

== Distribution ==
This species is present in most of Europe, in the eastern Palearctic realm, and in North Africa.

== Habitat ==
This species is usually associated with the margins of bogs, wet heaths, mires and heathlands.
