= Pelecocera pergandei =

Scientific classification
- Kingdom: Animalia
- Phylum: Arthropoda
- Class: Insecta
- Order: Diptera
- Family: Syrphidae
- Genus: Pelecocera
- Species: P. pergandei

Binomial name
- Pelecocera pergandei (Williston, 1884)

Synonyms
- Euceratomyia pergandei Williston, 1884

Species of fly

Pelecocera pergandei is a species of syrphid fly in the family Syrphidae.
