= Rhamphomyia clypeata =

Scientific classification
- Kingdom: Animalia
- Phylum: Arthropoda
- Class: Insecta
- Order: Diptera
- Family: Empididae
- Genus: Rhamphomyia
- Subgenus: Aclonempis
- Species: R. clypeata

Binomial name
- Rhamphomyia clypeata Macquart, 1834

Species of fly

Rhamphomyia clypeata is a species of dance flies, in the fly family Empididae. It is included in the subgenus Aclonempis.
