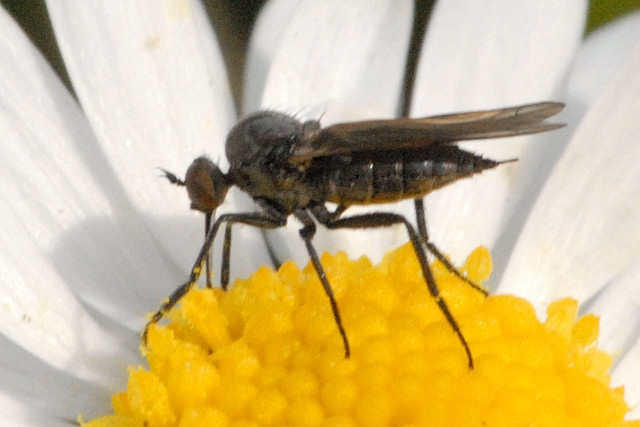
- Rhamphomyia umbripennis

Scientific classification
- Kingdom: Animalia
- Phylum: Arthropoda
- Class: Insecta
- Order: Diptera
- Family: Empididae
- Genus: Rhamphomyia
- Subgenus: Holoclera
- Species: R. umbripennis

Binomial name
- Rhamphomyia umbripennis Meigen, 1822

= Rhamphomyia umbripennis =

Species of fly

Rhamphomyia umbripennis is a species of dance flies, in the fly family Empididae. It is included in the subgenus Holoclera of the genus Rhamphomyia. It is found in most of Europe, from Ireland east to Slovakia and from Fennoscandia south to Italy. In the northern part of the range it is found from Norway to central Russia.
