= Rhamphomyia mariobezzii =

Scientific classification
- Kingdom: Animalia
- Phylum: Arthropoda
- Class: Insecta
- Order: Diptera
- Family: Empididae
- Genus: Rhamphomyia
- Subgenus: Aclonempis
- Species: R. mariobezzii

Binomial name
- Rhamphomyia mariobezzii Barták, 2001

Species of fly

Rhamphomyia mariobezzii is a species of dance flies, in the fly family Empididae. It is included in the subgenus Aclonempis.
