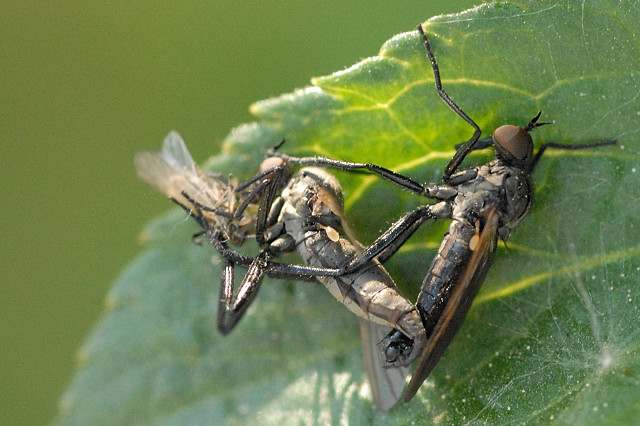
- Rhamphomyia sulcata

Scientific classification
- Kingdom: Animalia
- Phylum: Arthropoda
- Class: Insecta
- Order: Diptera
- Family: Empididae
- Genus: Rhamphomyia
- Subgenus: Rhamphomyia
- Species: R. sulcata

Binomial name
- Rhamphomyia sulcata (Meigen, 1804)

Synonyms
- Empis sulcata Meigen, 1804

= Rhamphomyia sulcata =

Species of fly

Rhamphomyia sulcata is a species of dance flies, in the fly family Empididae. It is included in the subgenus Rhamphomyia. It is found in most of Europe, except the Balkan Peninsula.

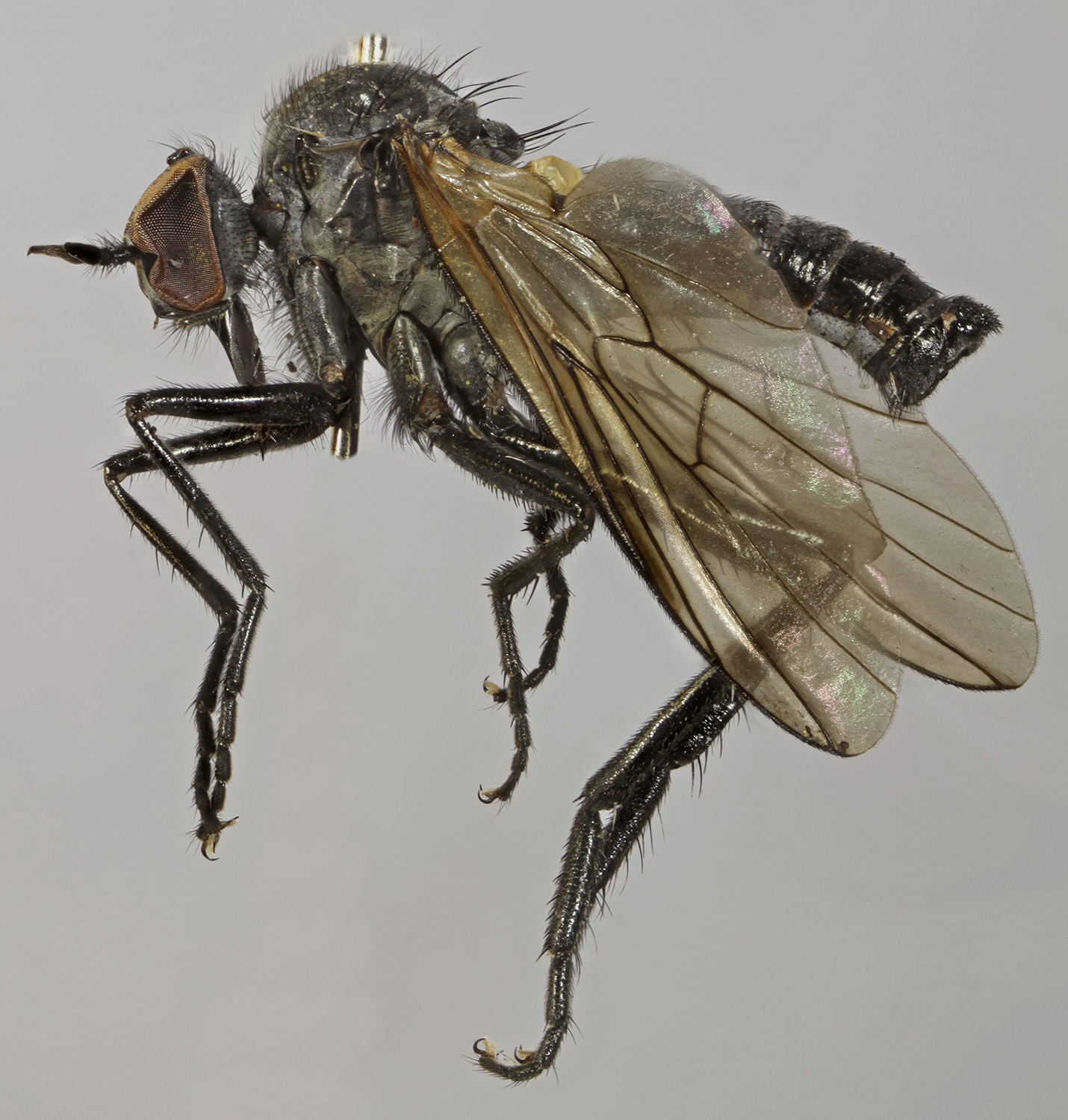
Rhamphomyia sulcata specimen North Wales long 6–8 mm.
