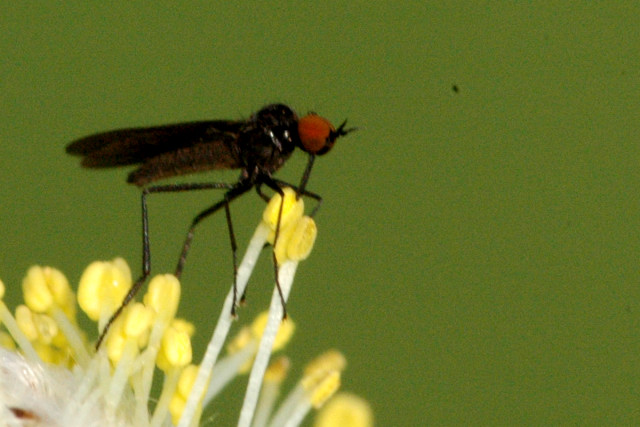

Scientific classification
- Kingdom: Animalia
- Phylum: Arthropoda
- Class: Insecta
- Order: Diptera
- Family: Empididae
- Genus: Rhamphomyia
- Subgenus: Holoclera
- Species: R. nigripennis

Binomial name
- Rhamphomyia nigripennis (Fabricius, 1794)

Synonyms
- Empis nigripennis Fabricius, 1794

= Rhamphomyia nigripennis =

Species of fly

Rhamphomyia nigripennis is a species of dance flies, in the fly family Empididae. It is found in most of Europe, except France, Italy, Croatia, Bosnia, Greece, Albania, Romania, Ukraine and Belarus
