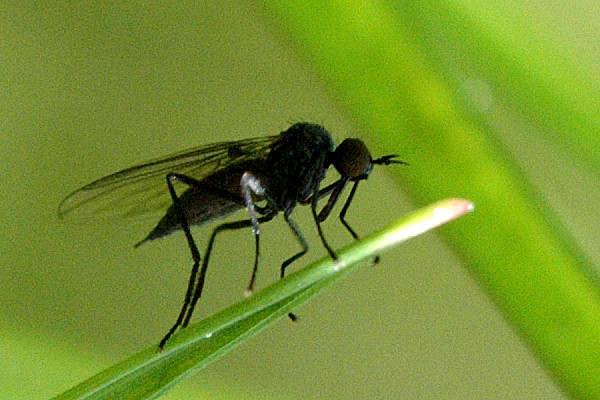

Scientific classification
- Kingdom: Animalia
- Phylum: Arthropoda
- Class: Insecta
- Order: Diptera
- Family: Empididae
- Genus: Rhamphomyia
- Subgenus: Pararhamphomyia
- Species: R. simplex

Binomial name
- Rhamphomyia simplex Zetterstedt, 1849

= Rhamphomyia simplex =

Species of fly

Rhamphomyia simplex is a species of dance flies, in the fly family Empididae. It has a limited distribution. It is known from Ireland, east to Germany and from Sweden, Finland and north-west Russia.

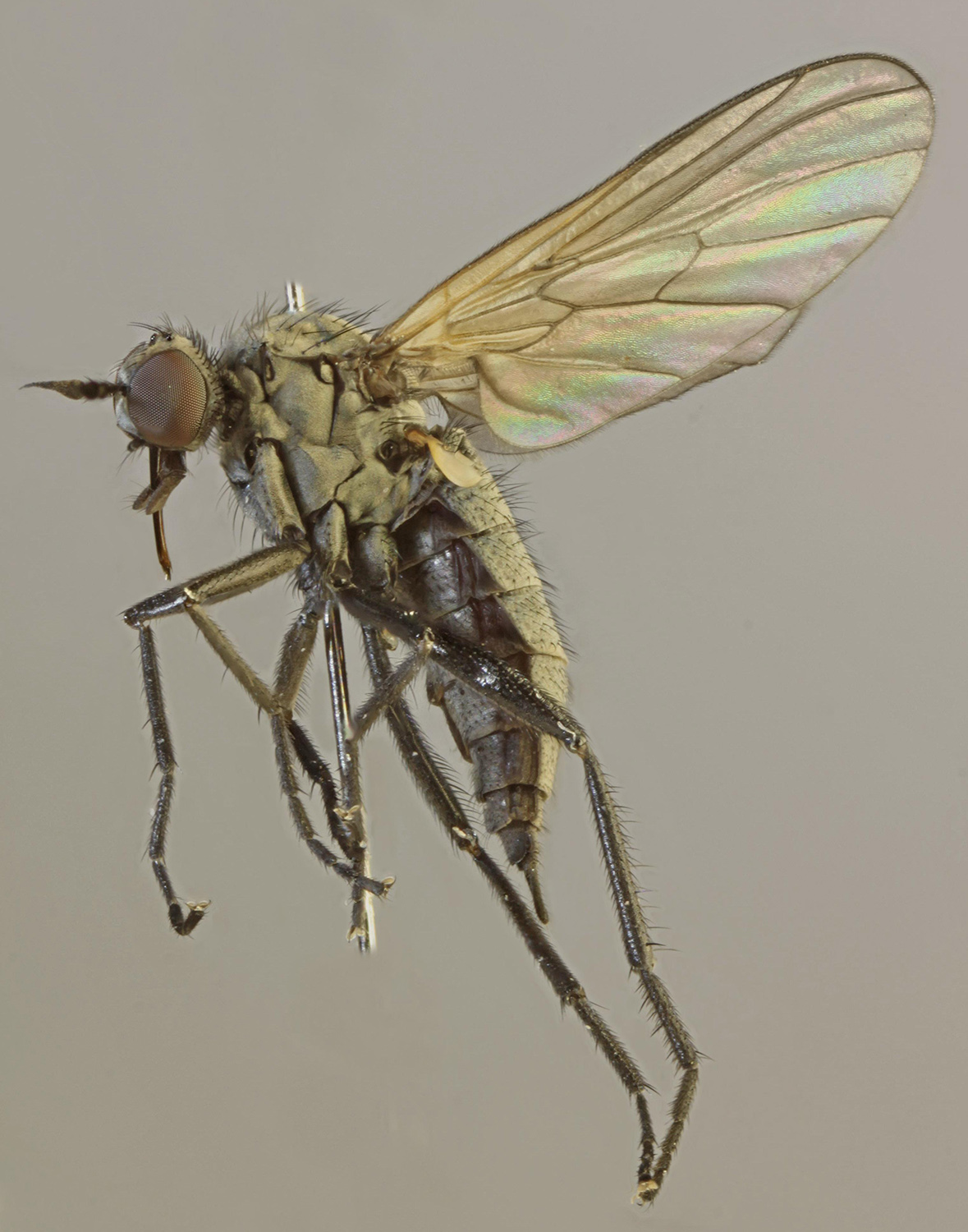
Rhamphomyia simplex specimen North Wales
