= Rhamphomyia tibialis =

Scientific classification
- Kingdom: Animalia
- Phylum: Arthropoda
- Class: Insecta
- Order: Diptera
- Family: Empididae
- Genus: Rhamphomyia
- Subgenus: Pararhamphomyia
- Species: R. tibialis

Binomial name
- Rhamphomyia tibialis Meigen, 1822

Species of insect

Rhamphomyia tibialis is a species of dance flies, in the fly family Empididae. It is included in the subgenus Rhamphomyia.
