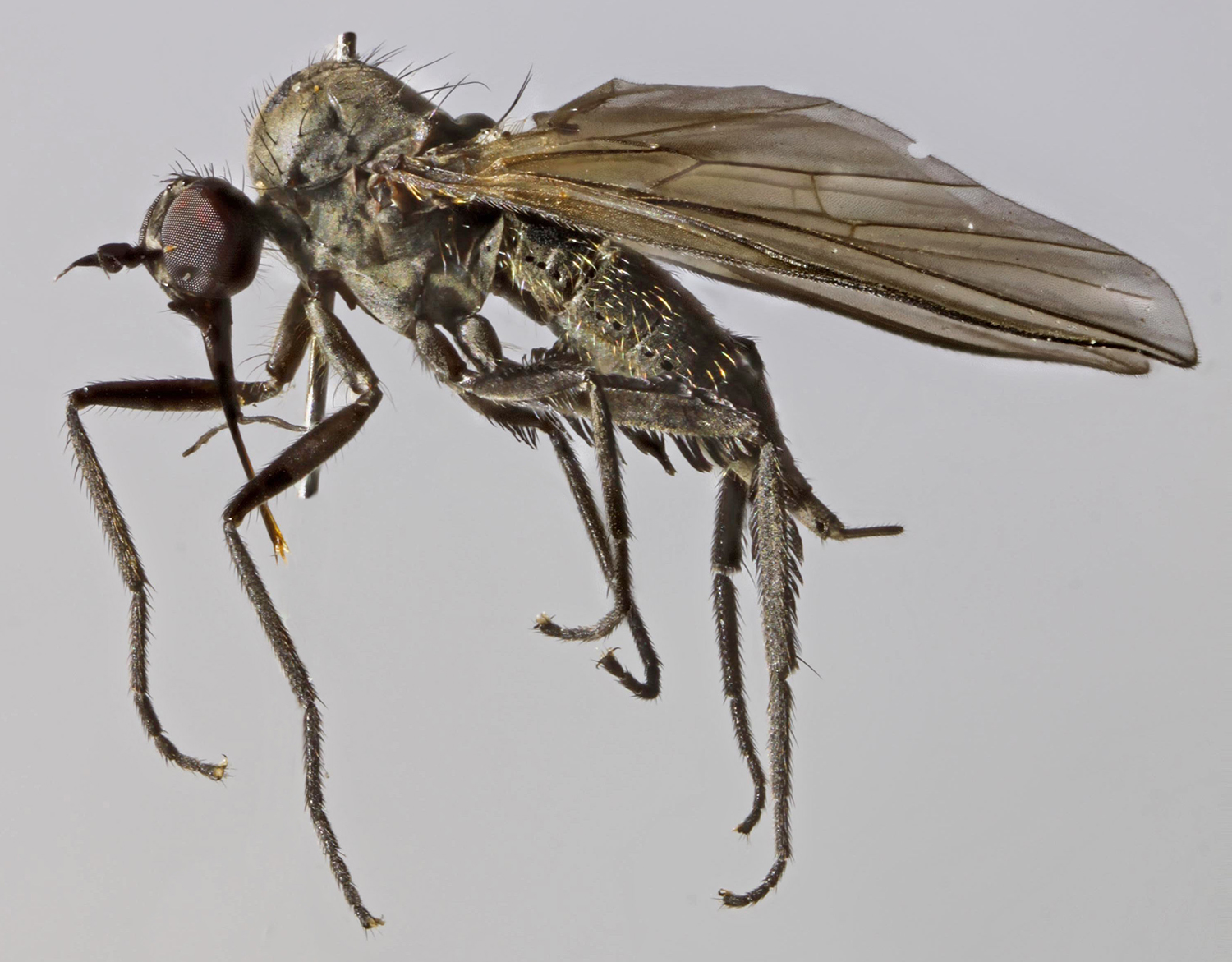
- Rhamphomyia albohirta North Wales Long 3 mm.

Scientific classification
- Kingdom: Animalia
- Phylum: Arthropoda
- Clade: Pancrustacea
- Class: Insecta
- Order: Diptera
- Family: Empididae
- Genus: Rhamphomyia
- Subgenus: Aclonempis
- Species: R. albohirta

Binomial name
- Rhamphomyia albohirta Collin, 1926

= Rhamphomyia albohirta =

Species of fly

Rhamphomyia albohirta is a species of fly in the family Empididae. It is included in the subgenus Aclonempis. It is found in the Palearctic.
