= Rhamphomyia geniculata =

Scientific classification
- Kingdom: Animalia
- Phylum: Arthropoda
- Clade: Pancrustacea
- Class: Insecta
- Order: Diptera
- Family: Empididae
- Genus: Rhamphomyia
- Subgenus: Pararhamphomyia
- Species: R. geniculata

Binomial name
- Rhamphomyia geniculata Meigen, 1830

Synonyms
- Rhamphomyia gracilipes Loew, 1840; Rhamphomyia squamigera Loew, 1840

Species of insect

Rhamphomyia geniculata is a species of dance flies, in the fly family Empididae. It is included in the subgenus Pararhamphomyia.
