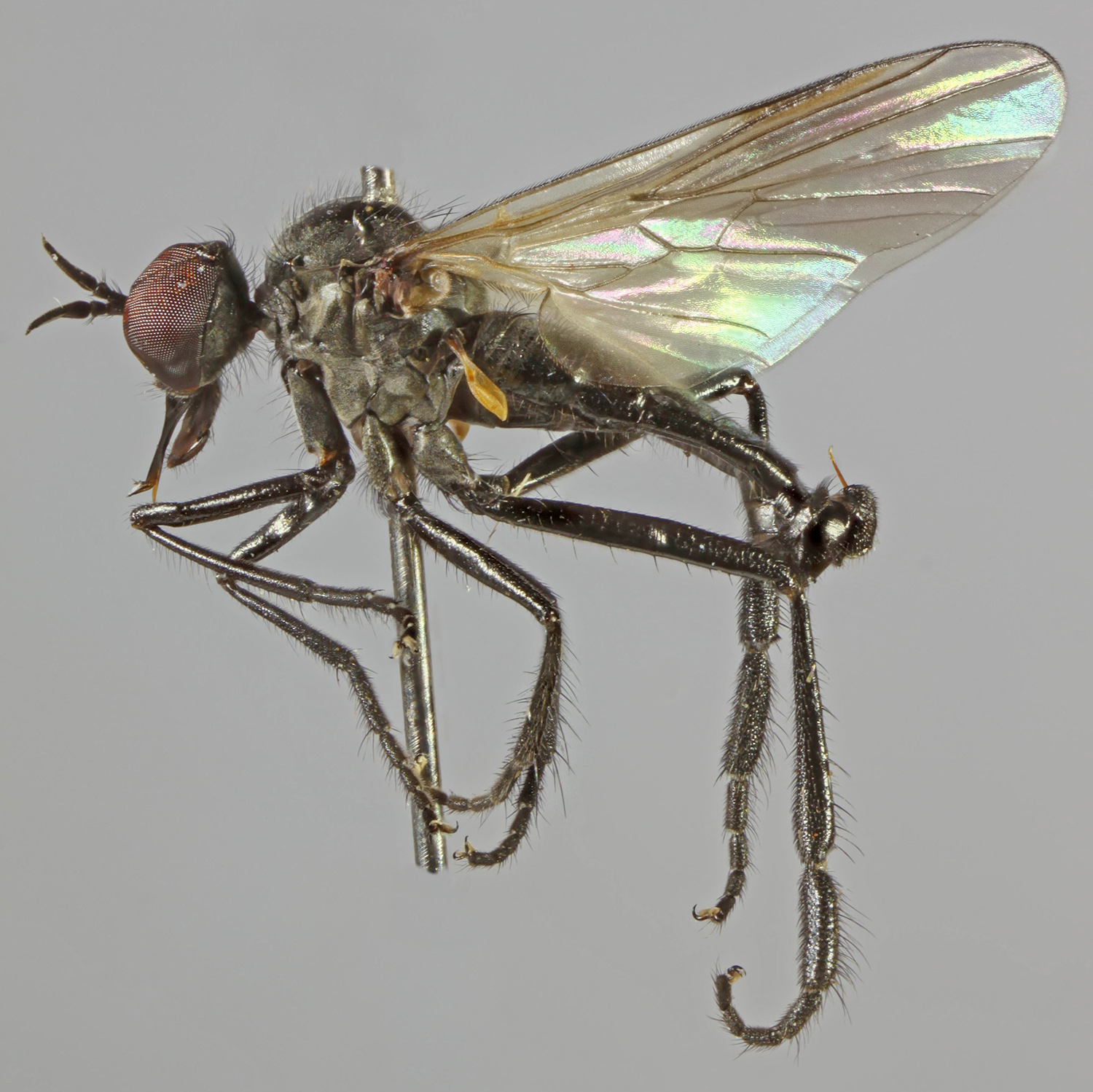
- Rhamphomyia nitidula North Wales

Scientific classification
- Kingdom: Animalia
- Phylum: Arthropoda
- Clade: Pancrustacea
- Class: Insecta
- Order: Diptera
- Family: Empididae
- Genus: Rhamphomyia
- Subgenus: Rhamphomyia
- Species: R. nitidula

Binomial name
- Rhamphomyia nitidula Zetterstedt, 1842

= Rhamphomyia nitidula =

Species of fly

Rhamphomyia nitidula is a species of fly in the family Empididae. It is found in the Palearctic.
