= Rhamphomyia speighti =

Scientific classification
- Kingdom: Animalia
- Phylum: Arthropoda
- Class: Insecta
- Order: Diptera
- Family: Empididae
- Genus: Rhamphomyia
- Subgenus: Lundstroemiella
- Species: R. R. speighti

Binomial name
- Rhamphomyia Rhamphomyia speighti Barták, 2006

Species of insect

Rhamphomyia speighti is a species of dance flies, in the fly family Empididae. It is included in the subgenus Lundstroemiella.
