= Chamaesyrphus caledonicus =

Scientific classification
- Kingdom: Animalia
- Phylum: Arthropoda
- Class: Insecta
- Order: Diptera
- Family: Syrphidae
- Genus: Chamaesyrphus
- Species: C. caledonicus

Binomial name
- Chamaesyrphus caledonicus Collin, 1940

Species of fly

Chamaesyrphus caledonicus is a Palearctic hoverfly.

== Description ==
Very similar to other Chamaesyrphus For identification see references.

== Distribution and biology ==
From Norway to Sweden, Finland, Scotland, Northern France, European Russia Germany (Bavaria). The habitat is Pinus sylvestris and taiga forest and sheltered coastal dune or heath systems. Flowers visited include Calluna vulgaris, Mentha, Saxifraga, Solidago virgaurea. Flies from July to October dependent on altitude and latitude.
