= Gabriel Strobl =

Austrian Roman Catholic priest and entomologist

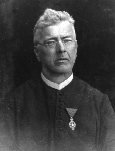
Gabriel Stobl

Gabriel Strobl (3 November 1846 in Unzmarkt, Styria, Austrian Empire – 15 March 1925 in Admont, Benediktinerstift) was an Austrian Roman Catholic priest and entomologist who specialised in Diptera.

In 1866 the then 20-year-old Gabriel Strobl became a Roman Catholic priest monk (Pater) at the Benedictine monastery Admont Abbey (Stift Admont). A devastating monastery fire in 1865 had destroyed the Natural History Cabinet (a museum) and its contents which had included Joseph Stammel’s Universe. He was entrusted by Abbot Karlmann Hieber (served 1861–1868) with rebuilding the Natural History Museum. In 44 years of work - until his stroke in 1910 - Gabriel Strobl built up the Museum anew. In his first 12 years of work, he devoted himself principally to botany, before dedicating himself completely to entomology for the following 32 years. Although his published work is mainly on Diptera he also worked on Hymenoptera and Coleoptera of the Balkan Peninsula which was partially ruled by Austria-Hungary until 1918.

== Partial list of publications ==
On Diptera:

- 1880. Dipterologische Funde um Seitenstetten. Ein Beitrag zur Fauna Nieder-Österreichs. Programm des Kaiserlich-königlichen Ober-Gymnasiums der Benedectiner zu Seitenstetten 14: 3-65.
- 1892. Die osterreichischen Arten der Gattung Hilara Meig. (Mit Beruckischtigung der Arten Deutschlands und der Schweiz.). Verhandl. zool.-bot. Ges. Wien 42: 85–182.
- 1893. Beiträge zur Dipterenfauna des österreichischen Littorale. Wien. Ent. Ztg. 12: 29–42, 74–80, 89–108, 121-136 and 161–170.
- 1893. Die Dipteren von Steiermark. Mitt. Naturw. Ver. Steiermark 29 (1892): 1–199.
- 1894. Die Dipteren von Steiermark. Mitt. Naturw. Ver. Steiermark 30 (1893): 1–152.
- 1898. Die Dipteren von Steiermark. IV Theil. Nachträge. Mitt. Naturw. Ver. Steiermark 34 (1897): 192–298.
- 1898b. Fauna diptera Bosne, Hercegovine I Dalmacie. Glasn. Zemalj. Muz. Bosni Herceg. 10: 387–466, 562-616 (in Serbian).
- 1899. Spanische Dipteren. II. Theil. Wiener entomologische Zeitung. 18: 12–27.
- 1899. Spanische Dipteren. III.Theil. Wiener Entomologische Zeitung. 18: 77–83.
- 1899. Spanische Dipteren. IV.Theil. Wiener Entomologische Zeitung. 18: 117–128.
- 1899. Spanische Dipteren. V.Theil. Wiener Entomologische Zeitung. 18: 144–148.
- 1899. Spanische Dipteren. VI.Theil. Wiener Entomologische Zeitung. 18: 213–229.
- 1899. Spanische Dipteren. VII.Theil. Wiener Entomologische Zeitung. 18: 246–250.
- 1900. Spanische Dipteren. VIII.Theil. Wiener Entomologische Zeitung. 19: 1–10.
- 1900. Spanische Dipteren. IX.Theil. Wiener Entomologische Zeitung. 19: 61–70.
- 1900. Spanische Dipteren. X.Theil. Wiener Entomologische Zeitung. 19: 92–100.
- 1900. Spanische Dipteren. XI.Theil. Wiener Entomologische Zeitung. 19: 169–174.
- 1900. Spanische Dipteren. XII.Theil. Wiener Entomologische Zeitung (Schluss.). 19: 207–216.
- 1900a. Dipterenfauna von Bosnien, Herzegovina und Dalmatien. Wiss. Mitt. Bosn. Herzeg. 7: 552–670. (German translation of the paper published in 1898b, with additions).
- 1900b. Spanische Dipteren. IX. Theil. Wien. Ent. Ztg. 19: 61–70.
- 1901. Tief's dipterologischer Nachlass aus Kärnten und Österreich-Schlesien. Jahrb. Naturh. Landesmus. Kärnten 26 (1900): 171–246.
- 1902. Novi prilozi fauni diptera Balkans'kog poluostrva [New contributions on the dipterous fauna of the Balkan peninsula]. Glasn. Zemalj. Muz. Bosni Herceg. 14: 461–517.
- 1904. Neue Beiträge zur Dipterenfauna der Balkanhalbinsel. Wiss. Mitt. Bosn. Herzeg. 9: 519–581. (German translation of Strobl 1902)
- 1906. Spanische Dipteren II. Mem. R. Soc. Esp. Hist. Nat. (Madrid), Segunda Epoca 3(1905): 271-422
- 1909. with Czerny, L. Spanische Dipteren. III. Beitrag. Verh. Zool.-Bot. Ges. Wien 59(6): 121–310.
- 1910. Die Dipteren von Steiermark. II. Nachtrag. Mitt. Naturw. Ver. Steiermark 46(1909): 45-293.

On Hymenoptera:

- 1900-1903. Ichneumoniden Steiermarks (und der Nachbarländer). 388 p.

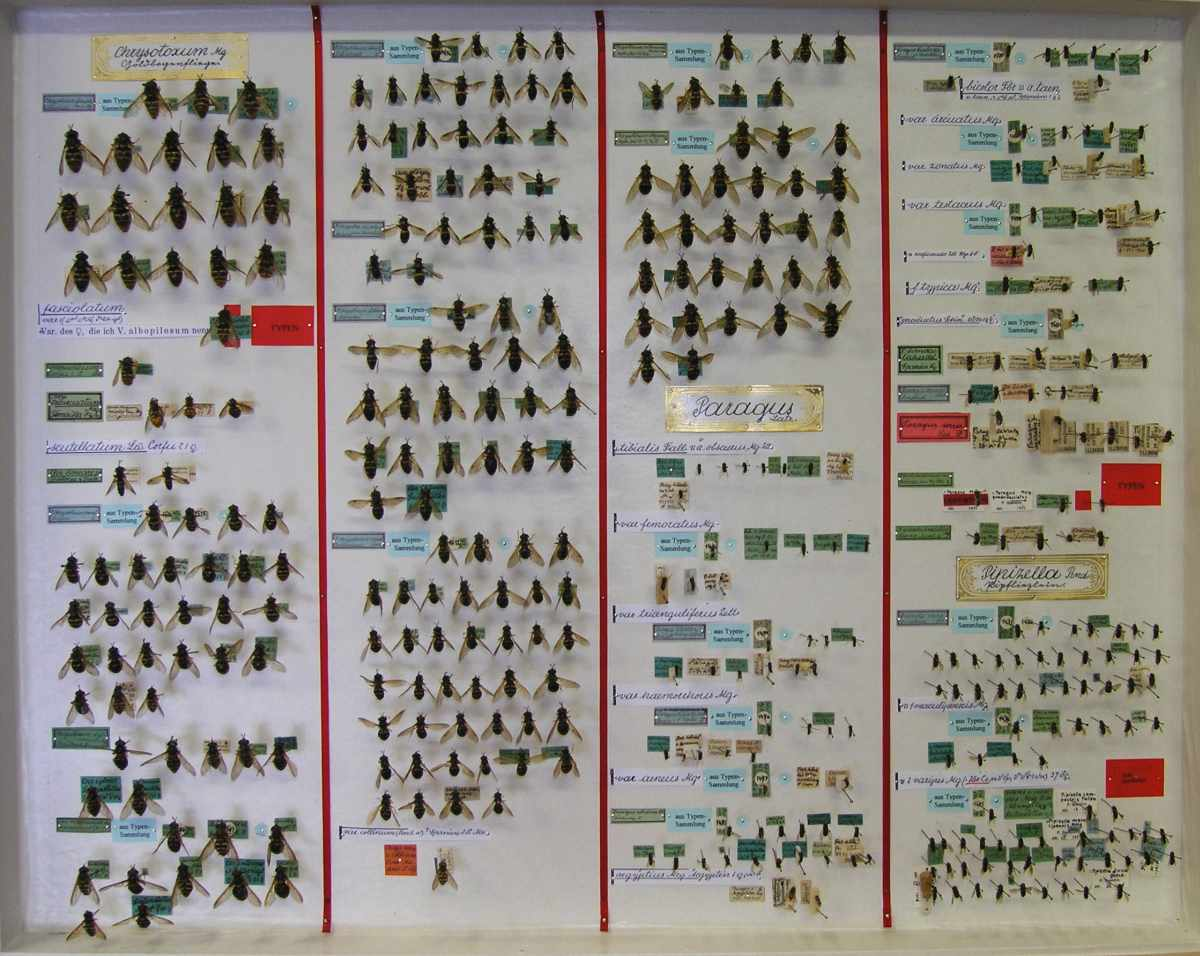
Gabriel Strobl Diptera collection at Admont Abbey

== Collections ==
Strobl's Diptera and Coleoptera (excepting exotic, i.e. Non-European species) are in the Natural History museum at Admont Abbey (Stift Admont) as well as are all his Lepidoptera. The exotic Coleoptera and Cicadidae, and all the Hymenoptera are in Landesmuseum Joanneum (Joanneum National Museum) in Graz. The Syrphidae via H. R. Meyer are in the Hessisches Landesmuseum in Darmstadt.
