= Lorenz Oldenberg =

German entomologist (1863-1931)

Lorenz Oldenberg (2 January 1863, in Berlin – 24 May 1931, in Berlin) was a German entomologist who specialised in Diptera.

Lorenz Oldenberg was an official at the Patent Office.

== Works ==
partial list

- Oldenberg, L., 1910, Vier neue paläarktische Akalypteren (Dipt.), Deutsche Entomologische Zeitschrift, 1910: 284-287.
- Oldenberg, L. 1914 Beitrag zur Kenntnis der europaischen Drosophiliden (Dipt.). Arch. Naturgesch. (A) 80(2):1-42.
- Oldenberg, L., 1928, Zwei neue Agathomyia-Arten (Dipt.), Konowia, 7: 311-313.
