= Richard Karl Hjalmar Frey =

Finnish entomologist

Richard Karl Hjalmar Frey (1886–1965) was a Finnish entomologist.

From 1919 to 1955, Richard Frey was head of the Finnish Museum of Natural History. He was primarily interested in Diptera and he described many new species in this Order. He studied exotic insects as well as those of Finland, especially those of Madeira and Cape Verde. Frey acquired by exchange or purchase many collections, notably the Georg Böttcher (1865–1915) collection of Philippine Diptera. When he retired, the University of Finland purchased his collection for the museum.

== Works ==
Partial list

- 1941 Volume VI.Diptera. Enumeratio insectorum fenniae Helsingfors Entomologiska Bytesförening, Helsingfors
- 1949 Die Dipterenfauna der Insel Madeira Sac. Scient. Fenn. Comm. Biol. 8, 16: l-47.
- 1958 with Walter Hackman Zur Kenntnis der Diptera Brachycera der Kapverdischen Inseln. Volume 18 Commentationes biologicae in Entomologische Ergebnisse der finnländischen Kanaren-Expedition 1947-51 Issue 20 Akademische Buchhandlung.
