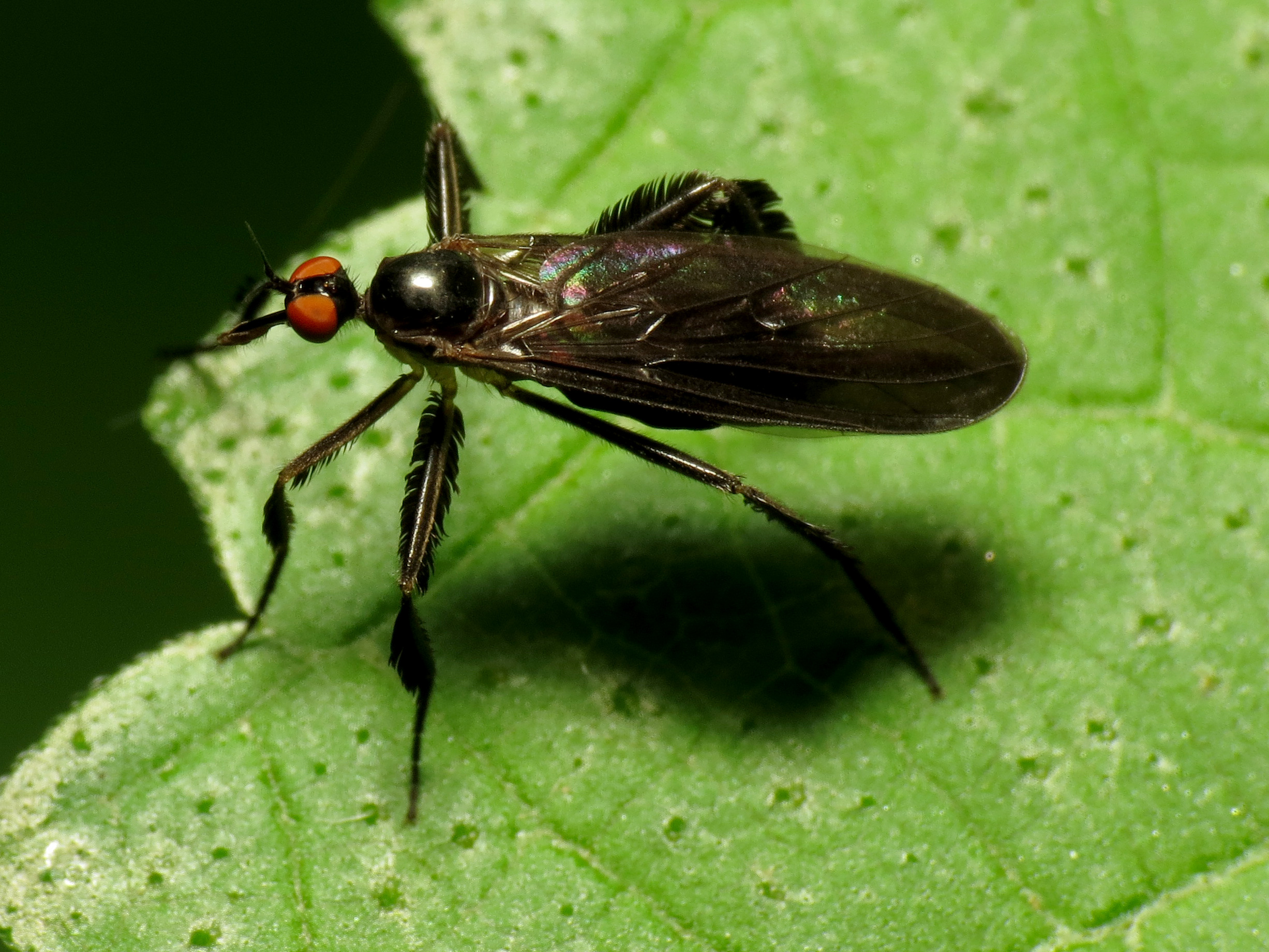

Scientific classification
- Kingdom: Animalia
- Phylum: Arthropoda
- Class: Insecta
- Order: Diptera
- Family: Empididae
- Genus: Rhamphomyia
- Subgenus: Rhamphomyia
- Species: R. longicauda

Binomial name
- Rhamphomyia longicauda Loew, 1861

= Rhamphomyia longicauda =

Species of insect

Rhamphomyia longicauda, the long-tailed dance fly, is a species of fly commonly found in eastern North America that belongs to the family Empididae and part of the superfamily of dance flies Empidoidea. It is included in the subgenus Rhamphomyia. This species of fly is most known for sex role reversal during courtship, as females put on exaggerated displays and congregate in leks to attract males. Females cannot hunt for food, so they receive protein from nuptial gifts brought to them by males. Female dependence on males for nutrition is the principal cause for sex role reversal in this species of fly.

== Description ==
=== Males ===
While this fly species is termed the long-tailed dance fly and its Latin nomenclature resembles the same meaning (Rhamphomyia = "crooked fly;" longicauda = longtailed), the "tail" actually references the male genitalia, which forms an elbowed erection towards the rear of the abdomen.

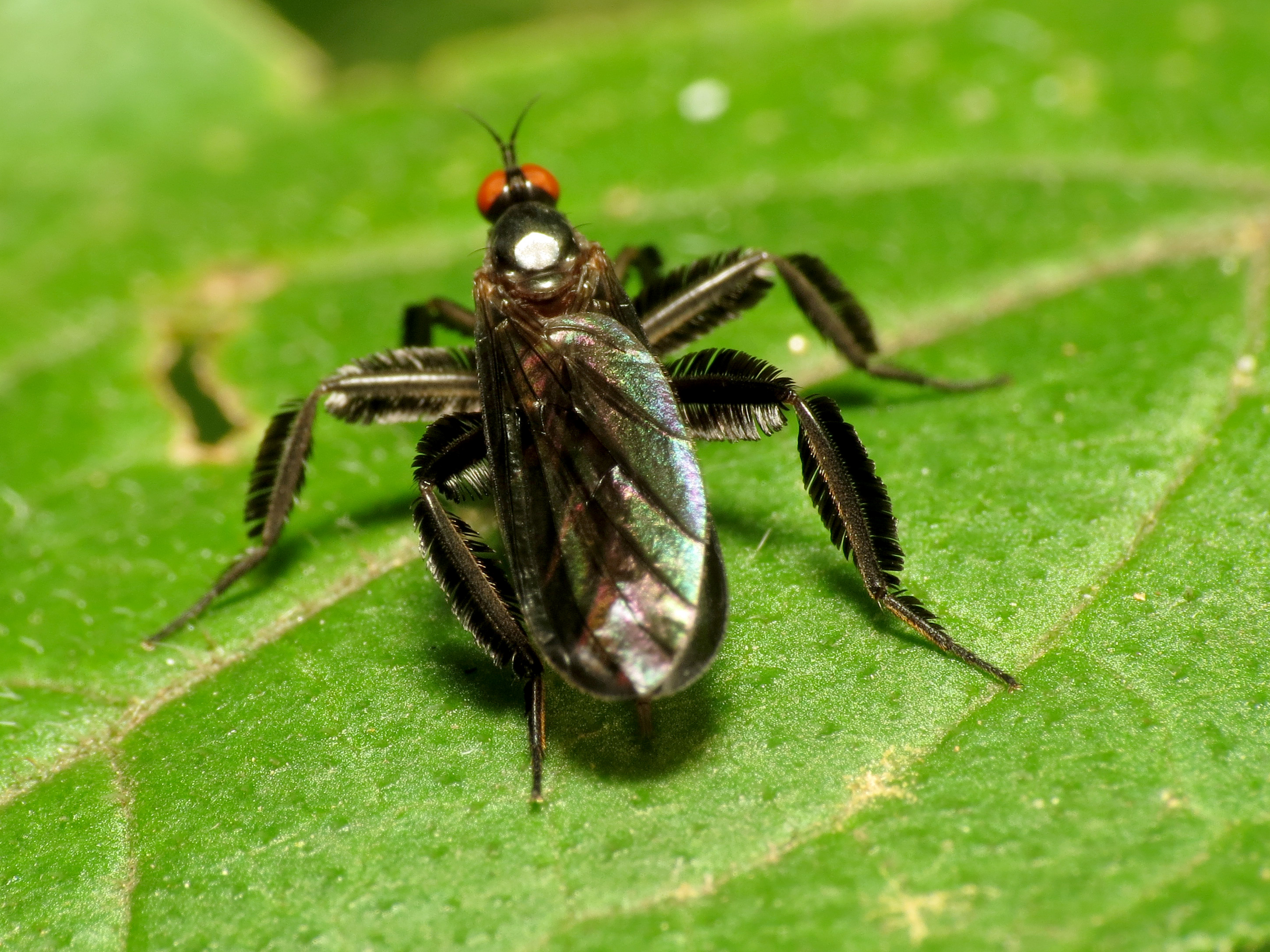
A female R. longicauda with protruding ovipositor, commonly referenced as its "long tail"

Common to many male Diptera, the dorsal section of the eyes is larger than the ventral section. The lengthened dorsal section, in addition to shortened wings, aids the male's ability to approach the female from beneath during mating.

=== Females ===
Females have black scales that protrude forwards and backwards on their middle and hind legs. They also have small hairs that cover the sides of the legs and tan abdomens. In comparison to males, females have larger and inflatable pleural sacs, larger wings, thorax length, and hind tibial length, which are the principal sexually dimorphic body parts. The ventral region of the female retina is larger than the dorsal region, which helps them locate encroaching males that are pursuing mating.[2] Males prefer females that have longer wings and shorter tibiae.

== Territoriality ==
During the mating season (May–July), females congregate in leks 10 minutes before sunset and remain together for up to 40 minutes just after dawn or before dusk. Females return to the same lek every night, even if already inseminated, unless there is significant inclement weather, like continued rain or winds above 14 km/h. Unique to this species, the lek site is not a grounded surface; they hover above the aggregation site in a horizontal plane .3 m-.6 m above the ground/vegetation under an opening in an otherwise enclosed canopy.

== Food resources ==
Females cannot hunt for food: they only receive protein from nuptial gifts brought to them by males. Female dependence on males for nutrition is the principal cause for sex role reversal in this species of fly. Males hunt an hour before sunset within a range of 30m from the lek site. They rapidly scour the area in a figure-8 flight pattern looking for food.

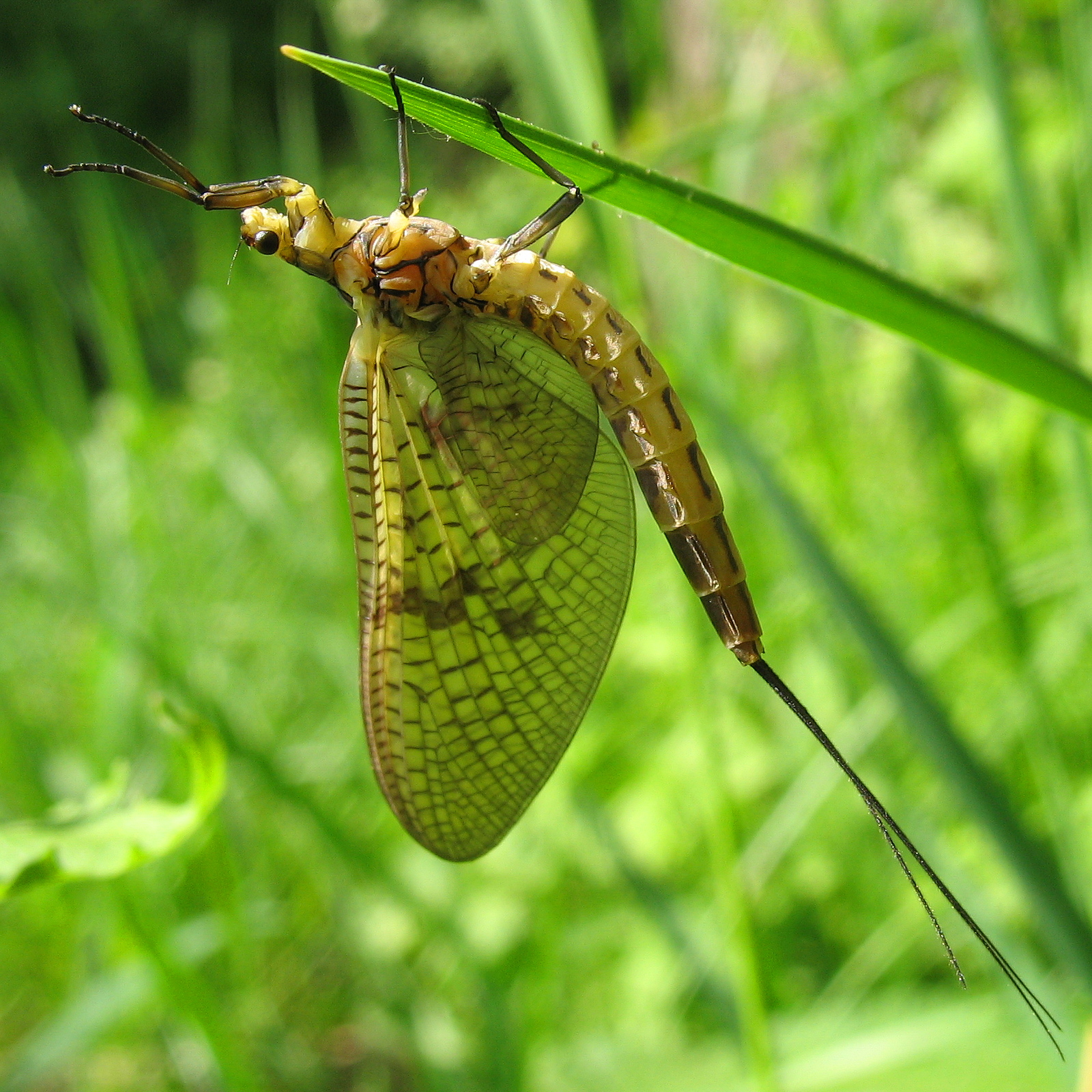
The mayfly is a common prey of R. longicauda

Males will eat any prey they can find, but they normally capture swarming insects. More specifically, most tend to prey on flies (Diptera), which make up 70% of their combined prey. They also feed on mayflies (Ephemeroptera) and caddisflies (Trichoptera), and infrequently feed on male ants, moths,[2] and mosquitoes. The size of their captures varies significantly, ranging from 2–4.5mm in one 5-year study.

== Mating ==
=== Courting ===
Before entering a lek, females rest on nearby vegetation and swallow air to inflate expandable pouches on the sides of the abdomen. The size of the abdomen is made to look even bigger by wrapping their large, scaly legs around their abdomen. Males enter female leks and discriminate first for female wing size. Model experiments showed that males give sexual preference to females with larger abdomen size. In females, there is a positive correlation between larger pleural sacs and greater egg length/number. Female abdomen size has evolutionarily correlated with extent of egg maturation in other species of Rhamphomyia, and females take advantage of this pre-established male preference to gain mates. Overall abdomen size does correlate to more developed egg maturity in R. longicauda, but inflation decreases the accuracy of body size as an indicator of egg maturity by 49%, making this a deceptive signal to entice males.

=== Leks ===
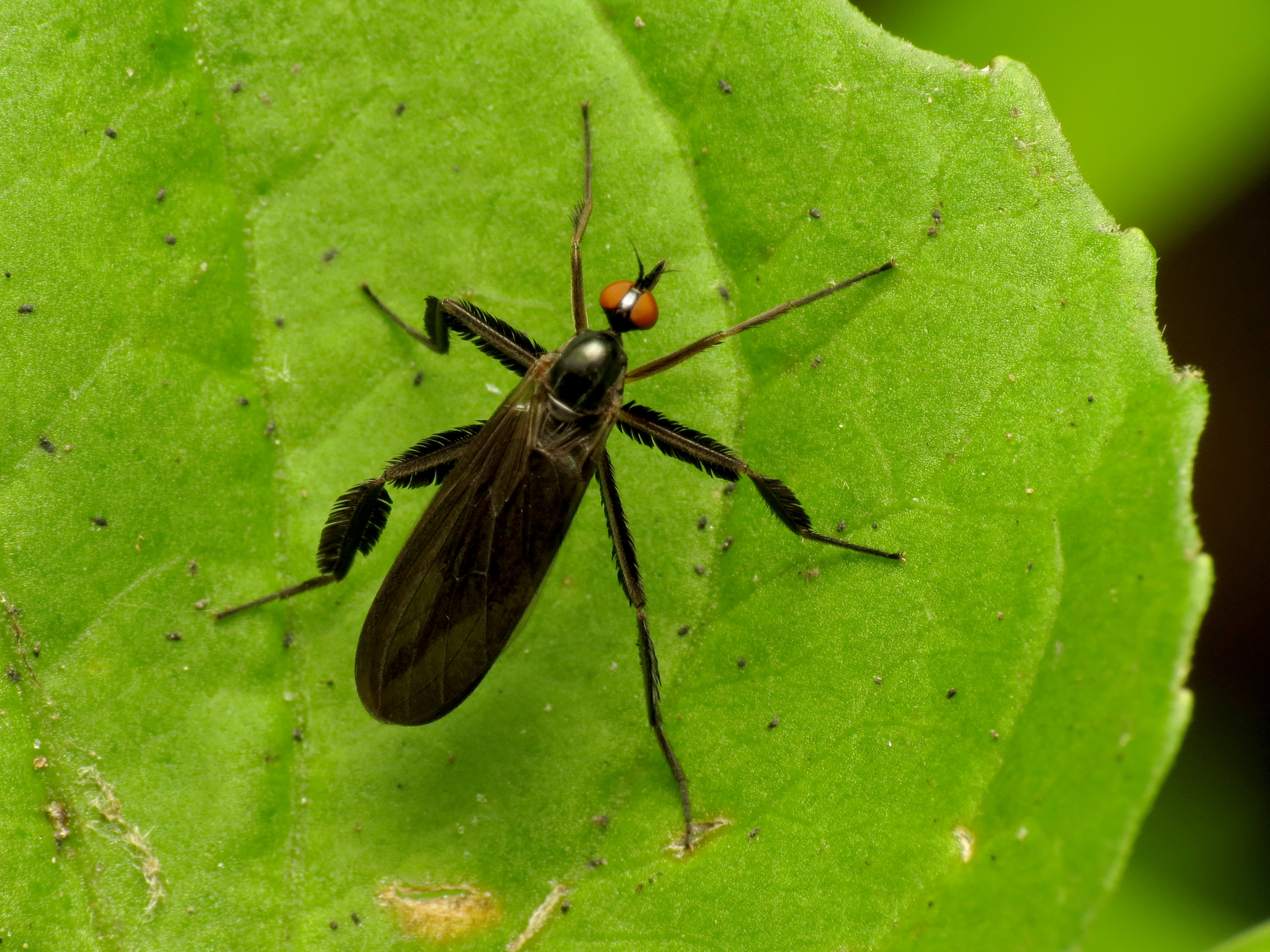
A female R. longicauda waits on nearby vegetation to fill her pleural sac with air before entering the lek

Females form leks in groups of 10–100 at sites under openings of an otherwise closed canopy. They return to the lek site every night to continue receiving nuptial gifts from the males; no virgins are found after almost two weeks of lek formation. Females hover over the lek site to provide them with backlighting so that they appear as silhouettes in order to exaggerate their size and deceive males. Stratification within leks was observed, as females with larger tibiae hover at lower positions in the swarm to receive the most copulations.

Males never enter a lek without prey but go immediately to lek sites after catching prey. They enter leks from below, or if they arrive before the females congregate, they fly by the swarm area several times and wait on nearby vegetation. Once females congregate, males fly below the females until she drops to him to receive his nuptial gift and mate.

=== Copulation ===
Males pass through the female swarm several times before finding a suitable mate. The male then ascends directly beneath the female about 1–2 cm below her, at which point the female drops down to the male. The two then fly away together at a faster speed away from the swarm, during which time the male gives the female the nuptial gift and recedes into copulating position. Flight pace slowed at the beginning of copulation. Nuptial flights last about 40 minutes.

=== Female-female interaction ===
Larger females hover at lower positions in the swarm to receive the most copulations. Horizontal positioning was also of importance, as central females also gained from more frequent encounters with males. However, unlike many male leks, females do not engage in physical altercations to receive better positioning within the lek.

=== Assortive mating ===
Females with the largest ornaments typically are more likely to attract a male in R. longicauda, and larger males typically mate with larger females, as they can bear their weight during the nuptial flight. During copulation, males must withstand the weight of the female and the nuptial gift during the flight, and because of this, there is no directional selection for increased body size or ornament size (pinnate leg scales and pleural sacs). Rather, female R. longicauda undergo stabilizing selection, as a female being too large lowers fecundity since many males will not be able to perform copulation with her.

== Enemies ==
=== Predators ===
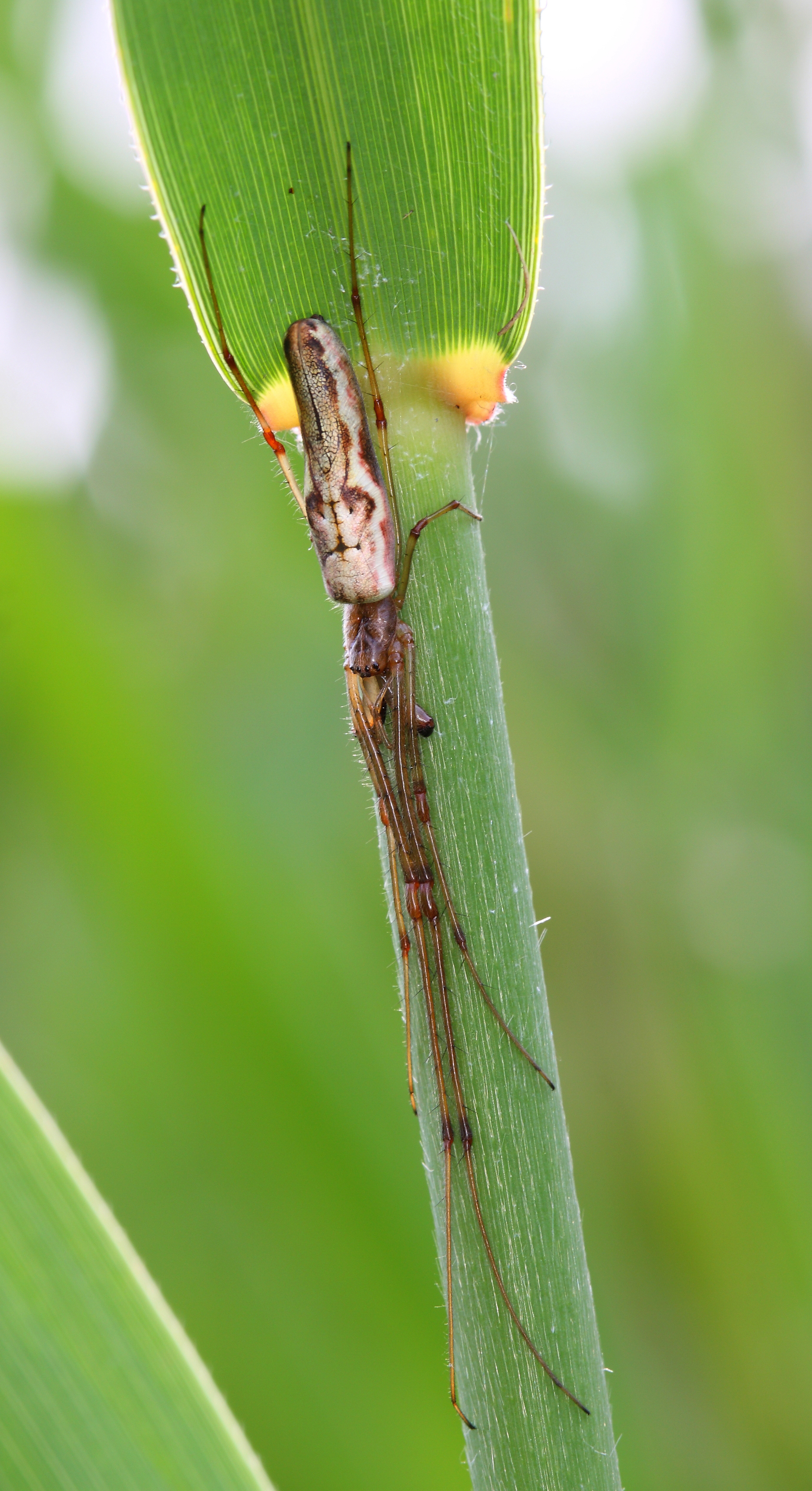
A Tetragnatha spider (longjawed orbweavers), common predator of R. longicauda

The Tetragnatha spider is a known predator of dance flies. It makes webs on the periphery of female swarms, making flies near the edge of the swarm more vulnerable to attack.

=== Victim dispersal ===
Another consequence to the sex role reversal is that females are also preyed upon at a higher frequency than males. Despite not foraging for food, more females are killed by spiders even in locations where both sexes are traversing because of the risky flight patterns females perform in order to get attention from males. This includes flying closer and more erratically towards nearby vegetation where spiders lay their webs. Researchers also note that the enlarged ornaments may also trigger higher predation rates. Neither enlarged ornaments nor risky flight patterns are observed in male dance flies.
