= Nuptial gift =

Nutritional gift given in reproduction

A nuptial gift is a material presentation to a recipient by a donor during or in relation to sexual intercourse, other than gametes, which increases the reproductive fitness of the donor. Such a gift will usually improve the fitness of the recipient as well, though they can also be neutral or costly.

Males may relinquish body parts, produce glandular secretions, or share prey or other food to gain fitness benefits, a process of natural and sexual selection. The study of nuptial gifting links sexual selection, nutritional ecology, and life history theory.

== Different types of gifts ==
Nuptial gifts are usually edible tokens: nutrition for the recipient. Many species of birds, insects, and spiders engage in courtship feeding: the gift of a food item from a male to a female just prior to copulation. Inedible tokens may be items such as a leaf or twig, a seed tuft, or a silk balloon, which may serve as an indicator of male fitness. More generally, in many species of insects, birds and mammals, males acquire and donate food to females either before, during, or after copulation, termed mate provisioning.

The source of the gift may be endogenous (produced by the donor) or exogenous (captured, collected or found by the donor). Exogenous gifts are often food items captured or collected by the donor to feed to the recipient. Endogenous gifts often carry great cost to the donor and usually contain hemolymph or body parts. Endogenous oral gifts are secreted by the donor’s glands (salivary, reproductive, etc.), often carrying nutrients or other substances benefiting the recipient or offspring. In the moth Utetheisa ornatrix, the male feeds the female defensive alkaloids to deter predation on their future eggs and larvae.

A gift may be received as an oral gift placed into the recipient's digestive system, a genital gift absorbed through the reproductive tract, or a transdermal gift injected into the body wall of the recipient. In some insects such as katydids and ground wētā, a nutritious genital gift is packaged with the sperm as a spermatophore.

In some species, mating can include gifts that benefit the donor but not the recipient. In hermaphroditic land snails, both partners to the courtship produce sperm and eggs, and it is in the interest of each to impregnate the other. Each partner attempts to shoot a mucus-covered love dart into the flesh of the other before attempting to give sperm into the other's ovipore. A dart may cause severe injury, but if it penetrates safely, pheromones in the mucus promote sperm retention in the ovipore, leading to fertilization in the recipient.

== Occurrence ==
Nuptial gifts are common in insects and other invertebrates, such as butterflies, fruit flies and katydids. They seem less common in spiders, though the spider species Pisaura mirabilis is known for nuptial gift giving. However, this may reflect experimental bias due to the ease of rearing this species in the laboratory, so more research is required to evaluate the scope of nuptial gifts among arachnids.

Courtship feeding is particularly common in bird species.

== Role reversal ==
Species in which the male presents the nuptial gift to the female are more common, but the reverse does occur. Female Zeus bugs, Phoreticovelia disparata, present the male with a food item before copulation. The male will then ride in a small depression on the back of the female, as she secretes wax from a gland on the back of her head, which he eats for up to a week. After the sperm is deposited and the male leaves, the female can lay fertile eggs for up to two weeks. Although it is difficult to see any advantages to the female in this scenario, some scientists believe that allowing one male to remain deters other males from violent attempts to copulate with her.

== Vertebrates ==
=== Great grey shrike ===
The male great grey shrike, a raptor-like passerine bird, gives prey (rodents, birds, lizards, or large insects) to females immediately before copulation. Shrikes are well known for impaling prey on thorns and sharp sprigs. Great grey shrike females select a mate according to the amount of prey impaled, with larders thus serving as an extended phenotype of the males. A large larder may make a mate more attractive as a regular mate and for occasional copulation with other females.

== Invertebrates ==
=== Arachnids ===
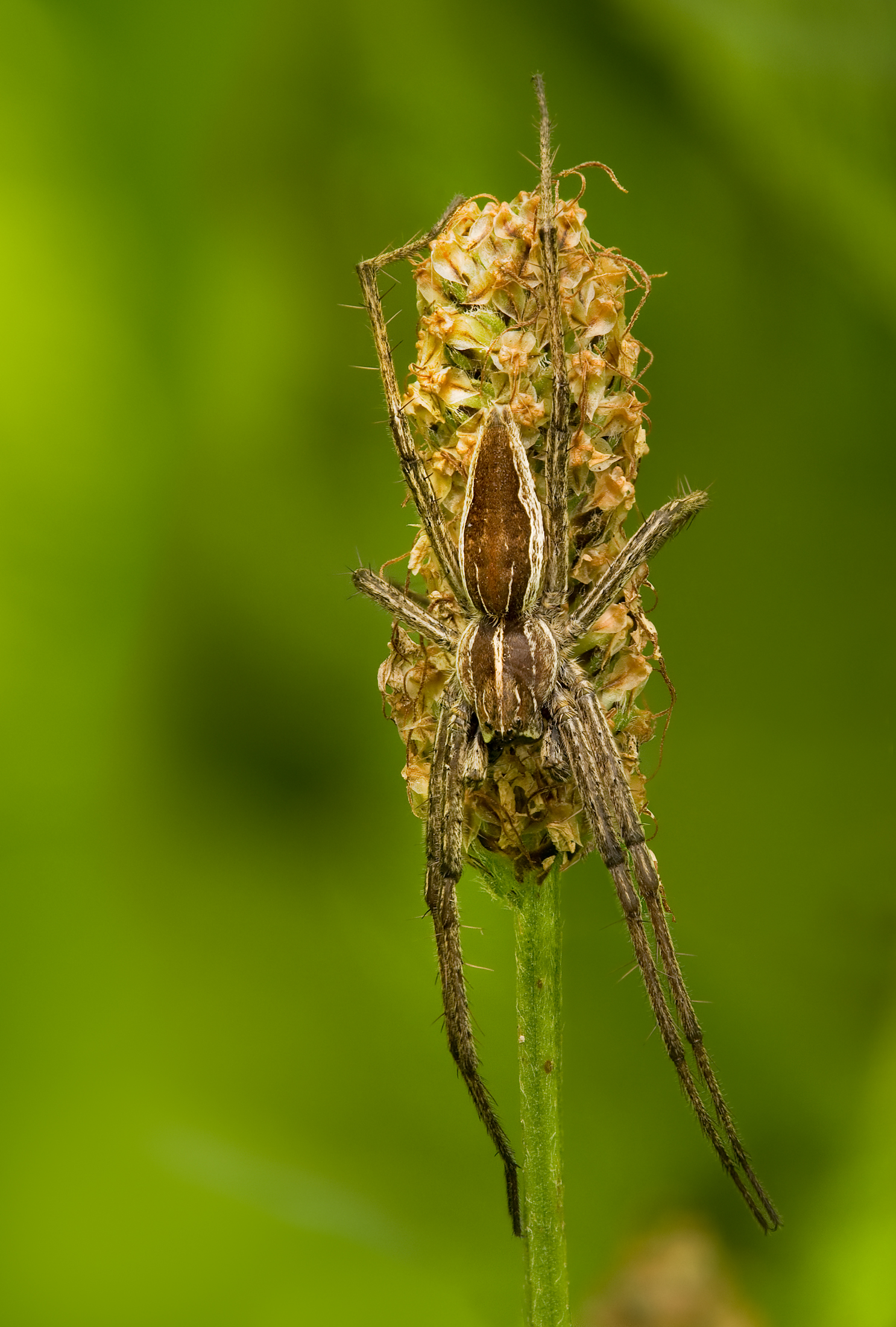
Pisaura mirabilis on Plantago lanceolata inflorescence

==== Pisaura mirabilis ====
In spiders, nuptial gifts in the form of prey are restricted to a few species from two families belonging to the superfamily Lycosoidea: Pisauridae and Trechaleidae. In both families, the male courts the female by offering a prey wrapped in silk and mating occurs while the female consumes the gift. In the species Pisaura mirabilis (Pisauridae), the gift functions as a mating effort that increases male mating success. The nuptial gift consists of a prey the male has caught and wrapped up in silk. The male offers this gift during courtship, and if the female accepts the invitation, she grabs the wrapped prey. While the female is eating, the male inserts the mating organ, and sperm is transferred.

A similar function was recently suggested for the trechaleid spider, Paratrechalea ornata. In both species, males can obtain mating without a gift, but male mating success increases dramatically when a gift is offered. There is a positive correlation between male size and mating duration, and an increasing mating duration when there is a gift offered. In Pisaura mirabilis, the male pushes up the female during mating and performs alternate pedipalp insertions into the female sperm storage organ, located ventrally on the abdomen. After each insertion the male returns to a face-to-face position with the female, grabbing the gift in the chelicerae. Females often control mating duration and they often attempt to run away with the gift upon terminating the copulation.

Females are less likely to succeed in stealing a wrapped – rather than an unwrapped – gift due to the silk wrapping of the gift. The silk wrapping facilitates male handling and control over the gift, as it facilitates a stronger hold of the silk covered package versus an unwrapped insect. Male spiders have a unique opportunity for gift manipulation through the gift wrapping trait, for example by preventing female assessment of the gift content. By disguising the gift content, males may deceive females to copulate, while the female attempts to consume the gift. In Paratrechalea ornata, males were observed wrapping prey carrion and occasionally inedible items such as plant seeds. In Pisaura mirabilis, males have been reported to carry gifts containing empty arthropod exoskeletons or plant parts: gifts of no nutritional value. However, some studies have shown that male spiders rarely cheat in nature. Cogent reasons for this disparate behavior are being explored. It is possible there are confounding factors which do not account for ecological implications. Other research suggests that sensory bias is not the main contributing force behind gift selection in P. mirabilis. Females did not preferentially select unwrapped gifts over wrapped gifts.

==== Pisaurina mira ====
Similar to its cousin P. mirabilis, male P. mira also offers nuptial gifts to court the females. The gifts typically consist of an insect wrapped around in silk. Acceptance of the nuptial gift leads to completion of copulation, and male P. mira retrieves the gift from the female.

==== Paratrechalea ornata ====
Nuptial gift behavior has been seen in the spider species Paratrechalea ornata, a Neotropical spider belonging to the Trechaleidae spider family. Paratrechalea ornata males may present either a wrapped or an unwrapped nuptial prey gift. Prey wrapping seems to be triggered by perception of cues on the female's silk and increases in frequency according to the male's age.

=== Insects ===
==== Balloon flies ====
Some Empididae, such as the European species Hilara maura, have an elaborate courtship ritual in which the male wraps a prey item in a silk "balloon" and presents it to the female to stimulate copulation. Empididae show diverse mating systems, ranging from species in which males aggregate in mating swarms, and compete for choosing females to sex-role reversed species in which females aggregate and compete for the attention of choosing males. In some species, such as the North American species Rhamphomyia longicauda, competition for the food provided by males is so strong that females have developed elaborate ornaments, including feathery "pennate" scales on their legs, darkened wings, and inflatable abdominal sacs that enhance their attractiveness. Across the group, nuptial balloons of species in the family range from small balloons containing large prey items (e.g., Empis aerobatica, E. bullifera, Hilara wheeleri), to balloons stuck to inedible dried prey items (e.g., E. geneatis), to completely empty balloons made of silk or saliva (e.g., H. sartor, H. granditarsis).

==== Decorated crickets ====
In decorated crickets, Gryllodes sigillatus (Orthoptera: Gryllidae), the nuptial food gift is a spermatophylax (a large, gelatinous, sperm-free mass) that surrounds a smaller, sperm-containing ampulla. Together, the spermatophylax and the ampulla constitute the male's spermatophore, which is transferred to the female during copulation and remains attached outside her body at the base of her ovipositor. After mating, the female detaches the spermatophylax from the ampulla and feeds on it while the ampulla remains attached and is emptied of sperm. Once the female has consumed or discarded the spermatophylax, she removes the sperm ampulla, terminating sperm transfer. Female cooperation is required for successful spermatophore transfer, and thus, males cannot impose copulations on females.

==== Bushcrickets ====
Bushcricket males offer a spermatophylax containing an ampulla. The nuptial gift is also protein-rich, which the females ingest into their reproductive tract. The size of the nuptial gifts positively influences the females refractory period and the males reproduction success. The size of the gift depends on the ampulla and serves as a sperm protection. In the bushcricket Ephippiger ephippiger, the females prefer older males, who have larger spermatophores offering better nutritional value during mating. The nutritional value is related to the female's metabolic needs, and stands as a benefit for females feeding on the spermatophores. Sometimes males produce lower dosages of sperm with a lower nutritional value the fourth time they mate. It may be possible the females are using age and gift quality as a proxy for mates with good genes as their offspring are likely to have high relative fitness. The spermatophore provides protection to the ampulla by preventing it from being removed prematurely. It is also hypothesized to provide direct nutritional benefit to the offspring through the paternal investment hypothesis.

==== Ornate moth ====
During mating in the ornate moth (Utetheisa ornatrix), males provide the female with a spermatophore containing nutrients, sperm and alkaloids that serve as chemical defense from predators. Such nuptial gift accounts for up to 10% of the male's body weight and represents the total parental investment the male provides. Females receive spermatophores from several males and direct a postcopulatory selection process in which they decide what sperm will fertilize their eggs.

==== Ostrinia scapulalis ====
The males of the species Ostrinia scapulalis provides proteins, carbohydrates, minerals, and sugars that are included in the spermatophore. This is their nuptial gift to the female. They are known to improve the female's reproductive output. The gifts are provided at a substantial cost to the male. Older males thus tend to produce larger spermatophores with more nuptial gift content since there are less future reproductive episodes possible for them.

==== Comma butterfly ====
In the comma butterfly (Polygonia c-album), males provide females with nutrients and protein via the nuptial gift to entice the polyandrous females to mate. Females are able to recognize and preferentially mate with males reared on higher-quality host plants as larvae, because they are able to provide superior nuptial gifts with higher protein and spermatophore content. When females mated with males that could provide larger investments, they were seen to not only allocate more resources to their egg production, but also to themselves in the form of female life expectancy, female maintenance, and future reproduction.

==== Rocky Mountain parnassian ====
Nuptial gifts can be given by butterflies such as the Parnassius smintheus, consisting of the male depositing a waxy genital plug onto the tip of the female butterfly's abdomen during copulation. It contains sperm and important nutrients for the female. This also ensures that the male is the only one to fertilize the female's eggs, as it prevents the female from mating again.

==== Six-spot burnet ====
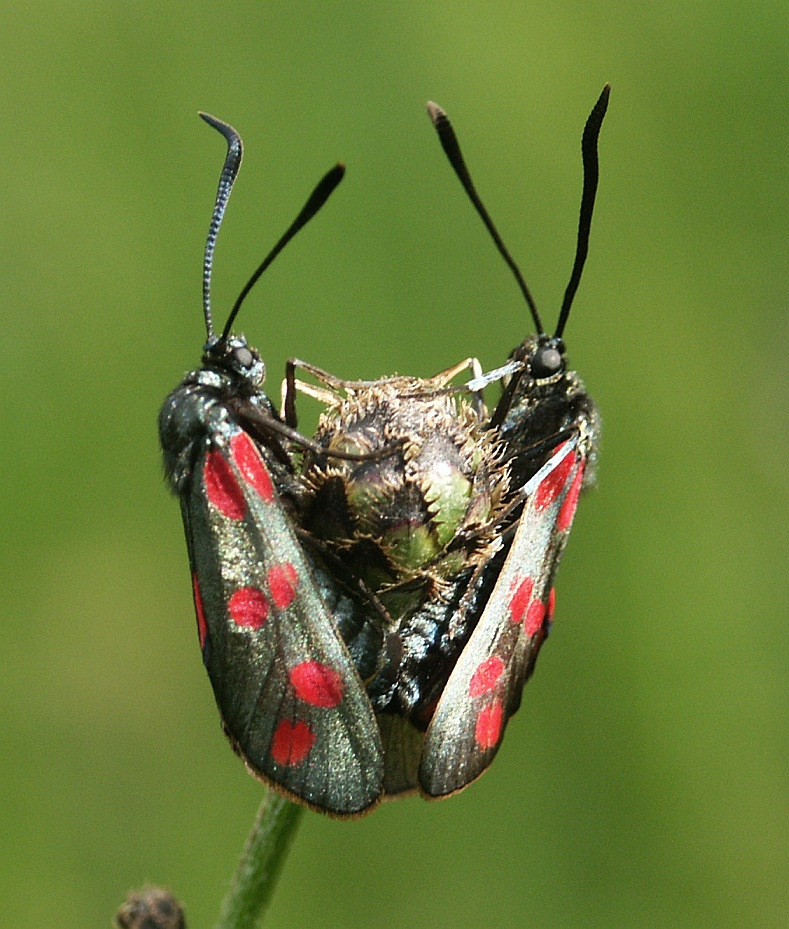
Six-spot burnet

Nuptial gifts are widespread in insects such as the six-spot burnet (Zygaena filipendulae), and comprise food items or glandular products offered as paternal investment in offspring and/or to promote mating. Female Zygaena may use this gift for her own defense and to protect her eggs.

==== Scorpionfly ====
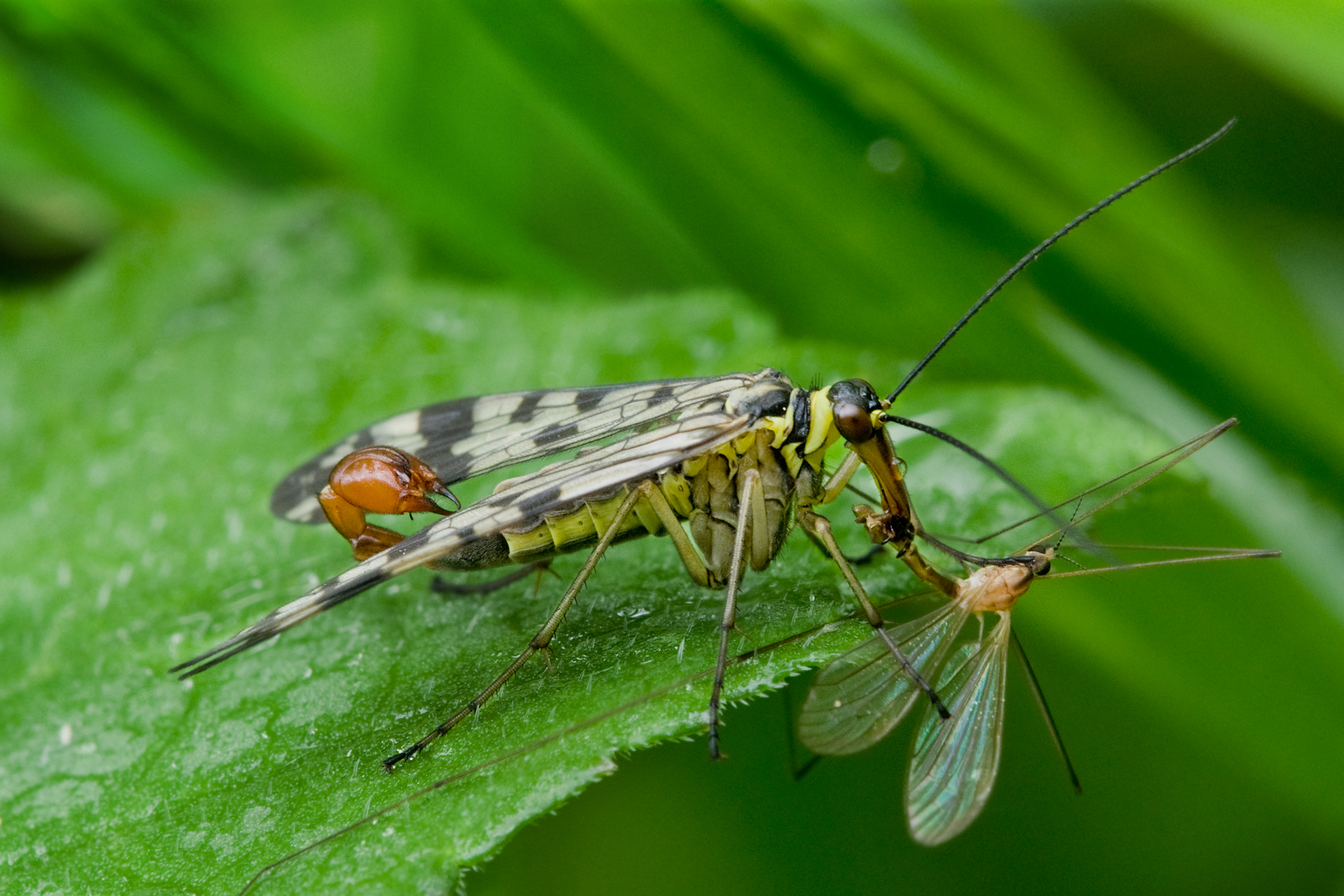
Scorpionfly with prey

In the scorpionfly Panorpa cognata, males offer a salivary secretion as a nuptial gift before copulation. Exchange of the salivary secretion takes place after prolonged courtship interactions. The nuptial gift is more likely to be accepted by the female if premating duration is long. Males in poor condition with a limited supply of saliva may deliberately delay initiating copulations to decrease the probability that their costly gift is rejected and, thus, wasted. Males in good condition with ample mating resources, on the other hand, may afford the risk of wasting a salivary mass and therefore take every opportunity to mate.

==== Drosophila mettleri ====
Individuals of both sexes of the Sonoran Desert fly, Drosophila mettleri, exchange a mixture of yeast and bacteria that is placed on the nesting site and used as a means of exposing larvae to natural florae needed for greater lifetime fitness and for nutrition. A wide community of yeast species live on the surface of these flies, and yeast is also found on the host plants of these flies.

==== Drosophila subobscura ====
In Drosophila subobscura, nuptial gifts are in the form of regurgitated drops of liquid from the male to the female's proboscis. The prevention of nutritional gift production and exchange has been shown to decrease both male mating success and female egg count. Additionally, males in good condition have increased mating success, largely because of their increased gift production.

==== Photinus fireflies ====
In Photinus fireflies, males create a spermatophore that is rich in nutrients and costly to produce. The mass of this spermatophore declines after each one is subsequently produced, and male mating success also declines. Females use the nutrients from the spermatophore to produce more eggs.

==== Fire-colored Beetle ====
Male Neopyrochroa flabellata ingest cantharidin, a fatty substance, and transfer it to females through the spermatophore during copulation. Females then use this cantharidin to protect their eggs, as eggs sired by cantharidin-fed males are significantly less likely to be eaten by predators than eggs that were not protected by cantharidin.

== Evolution, costs and benefits ==
Male sperm offers many nutrients to increase a female's lifetime and egg production. These nutrients include acids or sodium. Male sperm also protects females and their eggs from predators. The females would also gain a net benefit from a male's sperm. Female recipients are supposed to produce bigger offspring than those females who did not receive nuptial gifts. The eggs of female spiders who receive nuptial gifts may hatch at a higher rate than those without nuptial gifts. Historically, nuptial gifts were seen as nutritional substances given to females from males during mating. The male benefits from a net fitness. Although the gifts are costly to find or produce, the gifts will increase attraction and copulation with other females. One of the more recently identified costs to males is reduced running speed due to gift-carrying. This cost may be exacerbated in areas of high predation. Nuptial gifts can benefit a male by increasing his paternity share when females are promiscuous. In some insects, nuptial gifts allow the male to copulate longer and transfer more sperm to the female. In fruit flies, katydids, and scorpionflies, nuptial gifts contain substances that reduce a female's receptivity to additional matings. While nuptial gifts also may boost female fecundity, from a male's perspective, such investment will only be beneficial if it increases the number of his own offspring. In bell crickets, nuptial gifts may be necessary to avoid injury or death by cannibalistic females. This additional benefit allows gift-giving males to surpass the fitness of other males. In this way, females are exploiting the inherent sexual dimorphism of their species.

In species where males provide females with a nuptial gift during mating, there is a particular scope for males to manipulate females to acquire matings and prolong copulation to enhance their fertilization success. Typically, females control the duration and volume of sperm transfer throughout the mating process. Research has suggested that the gifts presented by males temporarily obstruct the female's capacity to manage the copulation event. Female choice for males with nuptial gifts could lead to the evolution of male deception by the use of token gifts. For instance, males can decrease the costs of mating by re-using gifts or by offering worthless gifts. Males of some dance flies may deceive females by offering inadequate or false gifts. Although males that offer inedible gifts run a higher risk of being rejected and may suffer from shorter mating periods compared to males offering edible gifts the chance of acquiring an extra mating should make deception an attractive strategy for males. Hence, males of the dance fly Rhamphomyia sulcata that use inedible token gifts to obtain mates are as successful as males offering small genuine gifts.

When nuptial gifts are given, they increase copulations and searches to find females to mate with. Albo and Costa conducted an experiment with Paratrechala ornata spiders to determine the function of the nuptial gift. Two groups of males were exposed to virgin females, 23 males with no nuptial gift (prey) and 21 males with a nuptial gift (prey). Mating and ovulation were recorded and the researchers found that males that gave a nuptial gift had better mating success, longer copulations, and longer palpal insertions than those who did not give an nuptial gift. Longer copulations were associated with earlier egg sac construction and oviposition. The researchers' findings suggest that nuptial gift giving represents male mating effort for P. ornata. Nuptial gifts would allow males to control copulation duration and to accelerate female oviposition, improving sperm supply and paternity, and minimizing possible costs of remating with polyandrous individuals. Additionally, Prokop found that female mate choice is dependent on nuptial gifts rather than female reproductive status as an unmated or mated individual. This effect demonstrates sexual selection's ability to make one sex more discriminatory than the other, since females may negatively impact their output of offspring by refusing mating events with males that do not offer gifts.

=== Benefits to the female ===
Nuptial gift giving is often described in such a way that it only really affects the male counterpart. Nuptial gifting is also of benefit to the female. It has been shown that female fireflies will route spermatophore (contain sperm and are produced by the accessory gland) nutrients throughout their body from a few hours up to a few days. One major benefit of this is that now the female does not have to hunt or graze as frequently, limiting her exposure to predation. Females also have the ability to direct the nutrition from the nuptial gift to the part of the body that needs it the most. Often it is directed towards metabolism. This can be seen within female Bushcrickets. An experiment was conducted whereby there were two groups of males, one group was fed high levels of ^{13}C the other, low levels. These males then presented their gifts to the females and the isotopic changes in exhaled breath of the females were measured after consumption. Within 3 hours, the stable carbon isotope ratio of the breath was the same as the ratio of male donors gift, proving that the female had directed the extra nutrients to metabolism.

== Deceptive strategies ==
Since nuptial gifts increase the chance of a successful mating event, but can be costly in time and resources for organisms to produce, some will resort to "cheating" behaviors by intentionally providing a potential mate with a non-beneficial nuptial gift that appears to be beneficial. This allows the “cheating” organism to have a chance at copulating without incurring the costs associated with creating a real nuptial gift for their mate. Various strategies of cheating have been observed in the wild and in controlled settings.

Male Pisaura mirabilis spiders will change the amount of silk used to wrap their nuptial gifts and conceal its contents, depending upon whether it is a "beneficial" or "useless" gift, with more silk being used on "useless" nuptial gifts. This behavior is even present in males with limited resources.

Another explanation for why males cover their nuptial gift with silk may be that it makes the gift resemble the female's egg sac. This would mean the nuptial gift is functioning as a sensory trap. Female Pisaura mirabilis spiders have been shown to pick up nuptial gifts more quickly if they more closely resembled their egg sac.

Male spiders have been observed stealing prey from another male's web, and then presenting it to a receptive female before mating. The male will then mate with the female while she consumes the prey. This cheating strategy decreases the male's energetic investment in foraging while still giving them an opportunity to mate.

== See also ==
- Evolutionary models of food sharing
