= Phoreticovelia disparata =

Scientific classification
- Domain: Eukaryota
- Kingdom: Animalia
- Phylum: Arthropoda
- Class: Insecta
- Order: Hemiptera
- Suborder: Heteroptera
- Family: Veliidae
- Genus: Phoreticovelia
- Species: P. disparata

Binomial name
- Phoreticovelia disparata D. Polhemus and J. Polhemus, 2000

Species of true bug

Phoreticovelia disparata, also called the Zeus bug, is a species of semi-aquatic bug from the family Veliidae (tribe Microveliini) with a unique form of sexual dimorphism. It is endemic to Australia (Queensland).

== Biology ==
Phoreticovelia disparata live near tropical rivers. They are 1–2 mm in length. It is the only known species (aside from its sister species Phoreticovelia rotunda) where the female feeds the male a nuptial gift. They are sexually dimorphic; the female mating form has a special glandular area on the dorsal surface of the body. The half-sized male (about 1 mm long) clings to her, feeding on the secretions of a pair of glands, sitting on his partner for several days. Both adult males and females have wings, but females are wingless at the mating stage, as they are still at the 4th or 5th larval stage (nymphs). In adult winged females, which are about 2 mm in length, the specialised feeding glands are lost.

== Name ==
The common name (Zeus bug) originates from the myth which in the ancient Greek god Zeus swallowed his first wife, Metis.
