= Paragus constrictus =

Scientific classification
- Kingdom: Animalia
- Phylum: Arthropoda
- Class: Insecta
- Order: Diptera
- Family: Syrphidae
- Genus: Paragus
- Species: P. constrictus

Binomial name
- Paragus constrictus (Šimić, 1986)

Synonyms

Species of fly

Paragus constrictus is a species of hoverfly. It is found in Southern Sweden and Denmark, Ireland, Spain, Germany, the French Alps, Switzerland, Austria, Italy, Yugoslavia and Turkey and Russia east of the Urals. This species may be distinguished from Paragus tibialis only by the shape of the male parameres. In both sexes it shares with P. tibialis the character of entirely pale-haired abdominal tergites, so it is distinct from Paragus haemorrhous which has dark hairs. Images representing Paragus constrictus
