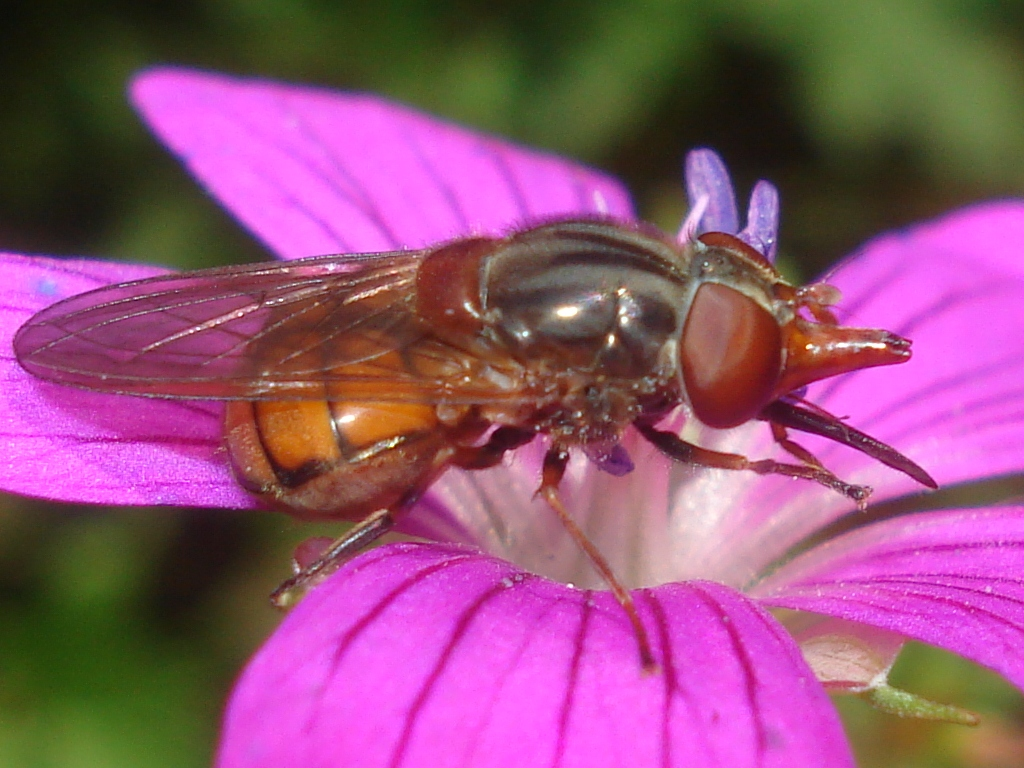
- Rhingia campestris (female)

Scientific classification
- Kingdom: Animalia
- Phylum: Arthropoda
- Class: Insecta
- Order: Diptera
- Family: Syrphidae
- Subfamily: Eristalinae
- Tribe: Rhingiini

Genera
- See text

= Rhingiini =

Tribe of flies

The Rhingiini (or Cheilosiini) is a tribe of hoverflies.

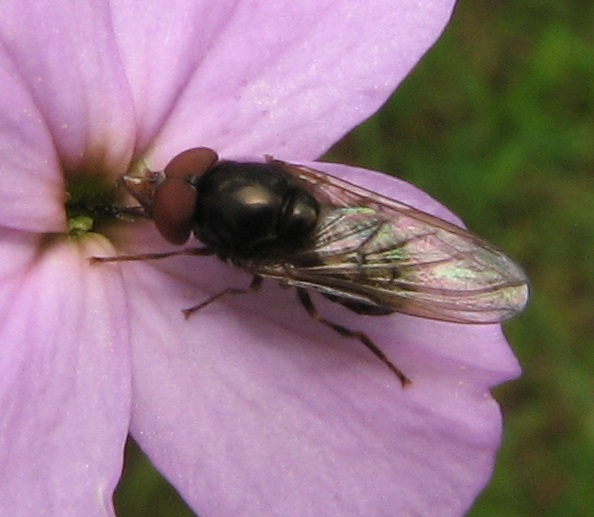
Rhingia nasica male

== List of genera ==
- Chamaesyrphus Mik, 1895
- Cheilosia Meigen, 1822
- Endoiasimyia Bigot, 1882
- Ferdinandea Rondani, 1844
- Hiatomyia Shannon, 1922
- Ischyroptera Pokorny, 1887
- Katara Vujić & Radenković, 2018
- Macropelecocera Stackelberg, 1952
- Pelecocera Meigen, 1822
- Portevinia Goffe, 1944
- Psarochilosia Stackelberg, 1952
- Psarus Latreille, 1804
- Rhingia Scopoli, 1763
- Taeniochilosia Oldenberg, 1916
