= F. aurea =

F. aurea may refer to:

- Ferdinandea aurea, a hoverfly species in the genus Ferdinandea
- Ficus aurea, the Florida strangler fig, golden fig or higuerón, a tree species native to Florida, the northern and western Caribbean, southern Mexico and Central America south to Panama

== See also ==
- Aurea (disambiguation)
