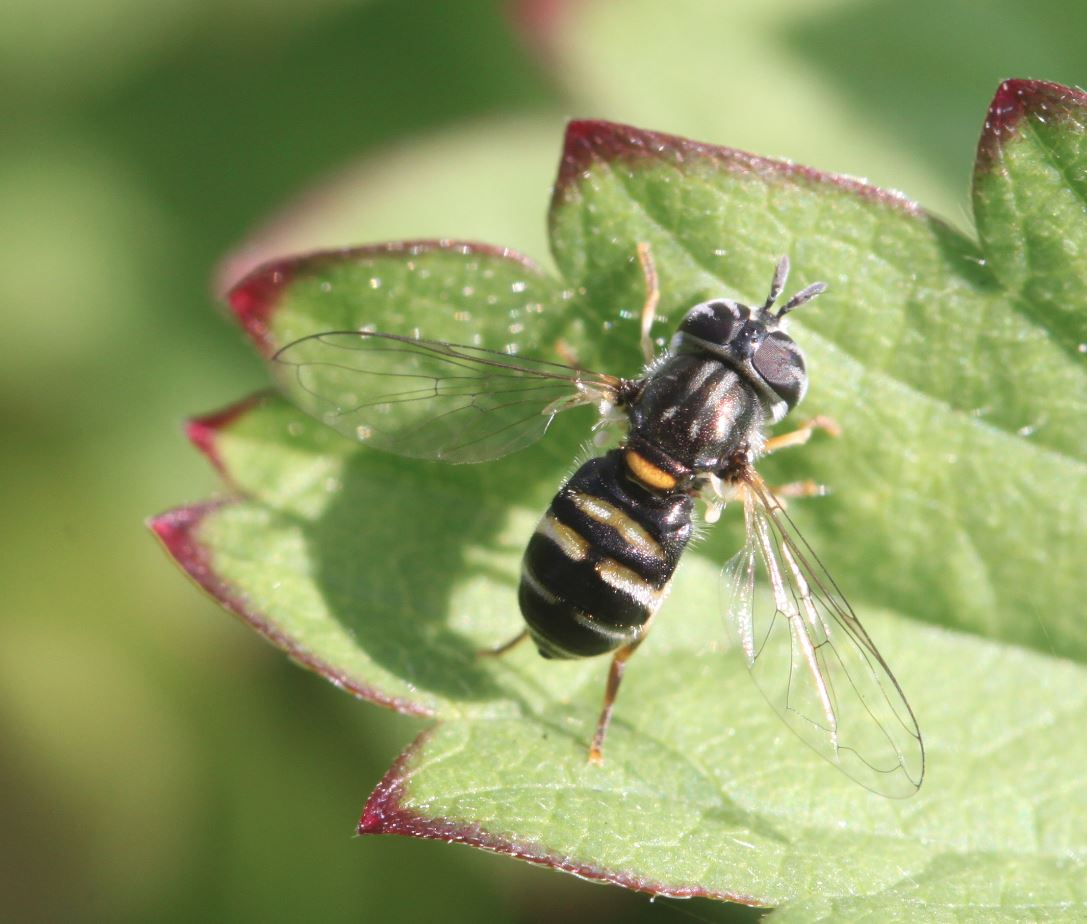

Scientific classification
- Kingdom: Animalia
- Phylum: Arthropoda
- Class: Insecta
- Order: Diptera
- Family: Syrphidae
- Subfamily: Syrphinae
- Tribe: Syrphini
- Genus: Paragus
- Species: P. quadrifasciatus

Binomial name
- Paragus quadrifasciatus Meigen, 1822

Synonyms
- Paragus variofasciatus Becker, 1907

= Paragus quadrifasciatus =

Species of fly

Paragus quadrifasciatus is a species of syrphid fly in the family Syrphidae.

== Distribution ==
France.
