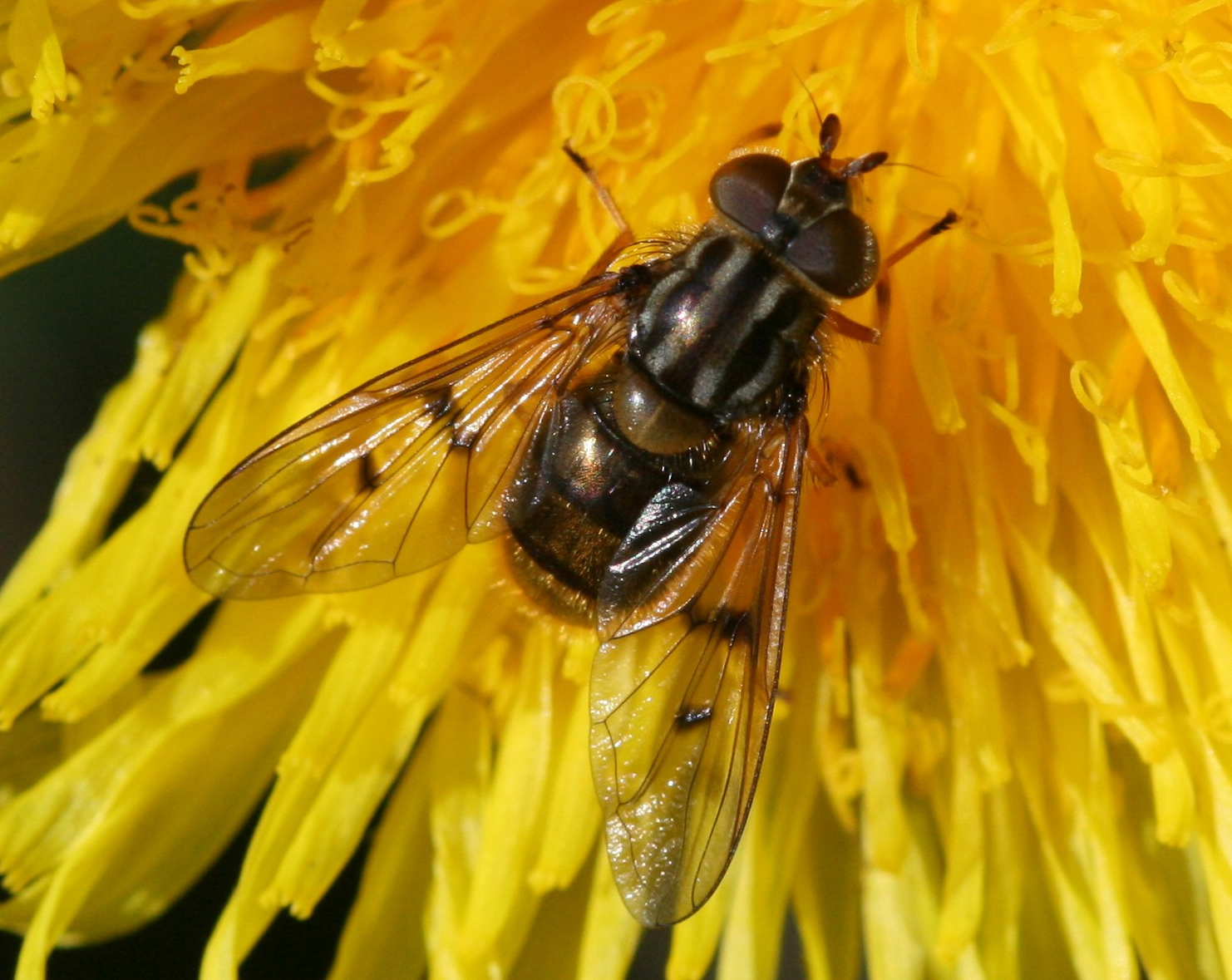
- Female

Scientific classification
- Kingdom: Animalia
- Phylum: Arthropoda
- Class: Insecta
- Order: Diptera
- Family: Syrphidae
- Genus: Ferdinandea
- Species: F. cuprea

Binomial name
- Ferdinandea cuprea (Scopoli, 1763)

= Ferdinandea cuprea =

Species of fly

Ferdinandea cuprea is a European species of hoverfly notable for its brassy abdomen. The larvae have been found in sap from trunk damage on oak and ash.

== Description ==
Wing length 7·25-11·25 mm. Thorax dorsum black with grey dust, with longitudinal black stripes strong black. Abdomen greenish with dull bands connecting to hind margin. Dark marks on the wings. Arista black. Male genitalia figured by Coe (1953).Larva illustrated by Hartley (1961) and Rotheray (1993) and in colour by Rotheray (1993) See references

== Distribution ==
Palaearctic Fennoscandia South to southern Spain and the Mediterranean basin to Turkey. Ireland East through Central Europe and North Europe to the Pacific coast of Siberia and Japan.

== Biology ==
Habitat:Populus-Salix, Carpinus-Quercus woodlands, Quercus pubescens and Quercus pyrenaica forest and Betula forest. Usually on the trunks of standing, live trees, or on the cut ends of stacked logs, in glades, or at the edge of clearings and along tracks or at sap runs. Flowers visited include Convolvulus, Crataegus, Hieracium, Leontodon, Lonicera, Mentha, Oenothera, Prunus cerasus, Ranunculus, Rosa, Rubus fruticosus, Sonchus, Taraxacum, Ulmus. The flight period is April to September (North Europe). The larvae have been found in wet, decomposing tree roots of Quercus and in the tree humus trunk cavities of Quercus as well as at sap runs. They may be both saprophages and detritivores.
