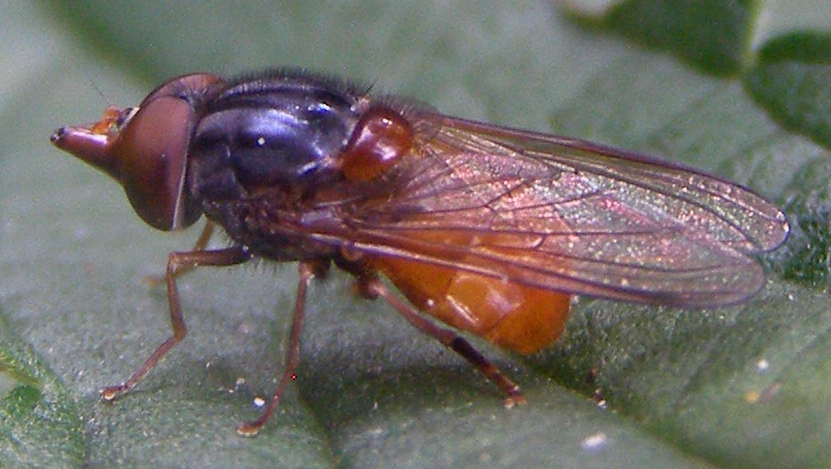

Scientific classification
- Kingdom: Animalia
- Phylum: Arthropoda
- Class: Insecta
- Order: Diptera
- Family: Syrphidae
- Genus: Rhingia
- Species: R. rostrata

Binomial name
- Rhingia rostrata (Linnaeus, 1758)

Synonyms
- Conops rostrata Linnaeus, 1758

= Rhingia rostrata =

Species of fly

Rhingia rostrata is a small species of hoverfly, some 7 to 10 millimetres (0.28 to 0.39 in) in length, with a wing span of 11 to 16 mm (0.43 to 0.63 in). It is common in many parts of Europe from March until November, though is slightly less common than Rhingia campestris in many parts of it range. In Britain it is only found in southern England. It has a broad orange abdomen, but lacking the black line along the side of the abdomen as in Rhingia campestris. Also living Rhingia rostrata has an orange scutellum, though this fades to brown in dead specimens. But it still has the distinctive long snout of all Rhingia species. Larvae are associated with cow dung. Adults feed on nectar and pollen.
