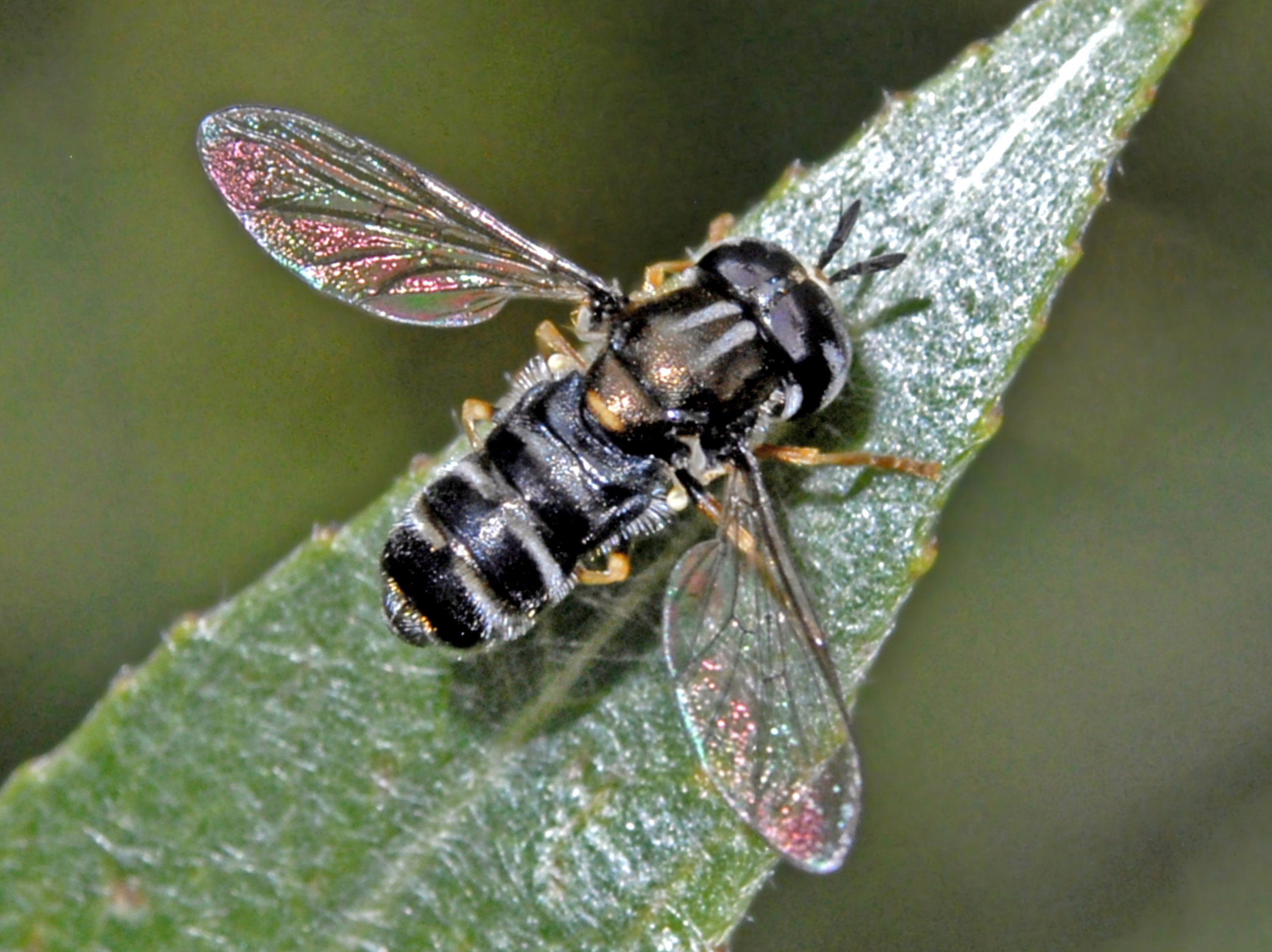
- Paragus pecchiolii, dorsal view

Scientific classification
- Kingdom: Animalia
- Phylum: Arthropoda
- Class: Insecta
- Order: Diptera
- Family: Syrphidae
- Genus: Paragus
- Species: P. pecchiolii

Binomial name
- Paragus pecchiolii Rondani, 1857

Synonyms
- Paragus tarsatus Rondani; Paragus majoranae Rondani, 1857

= Paragus pecchiolii =

Species of fly

Paragus pecchiolii is a species of hoverfly.

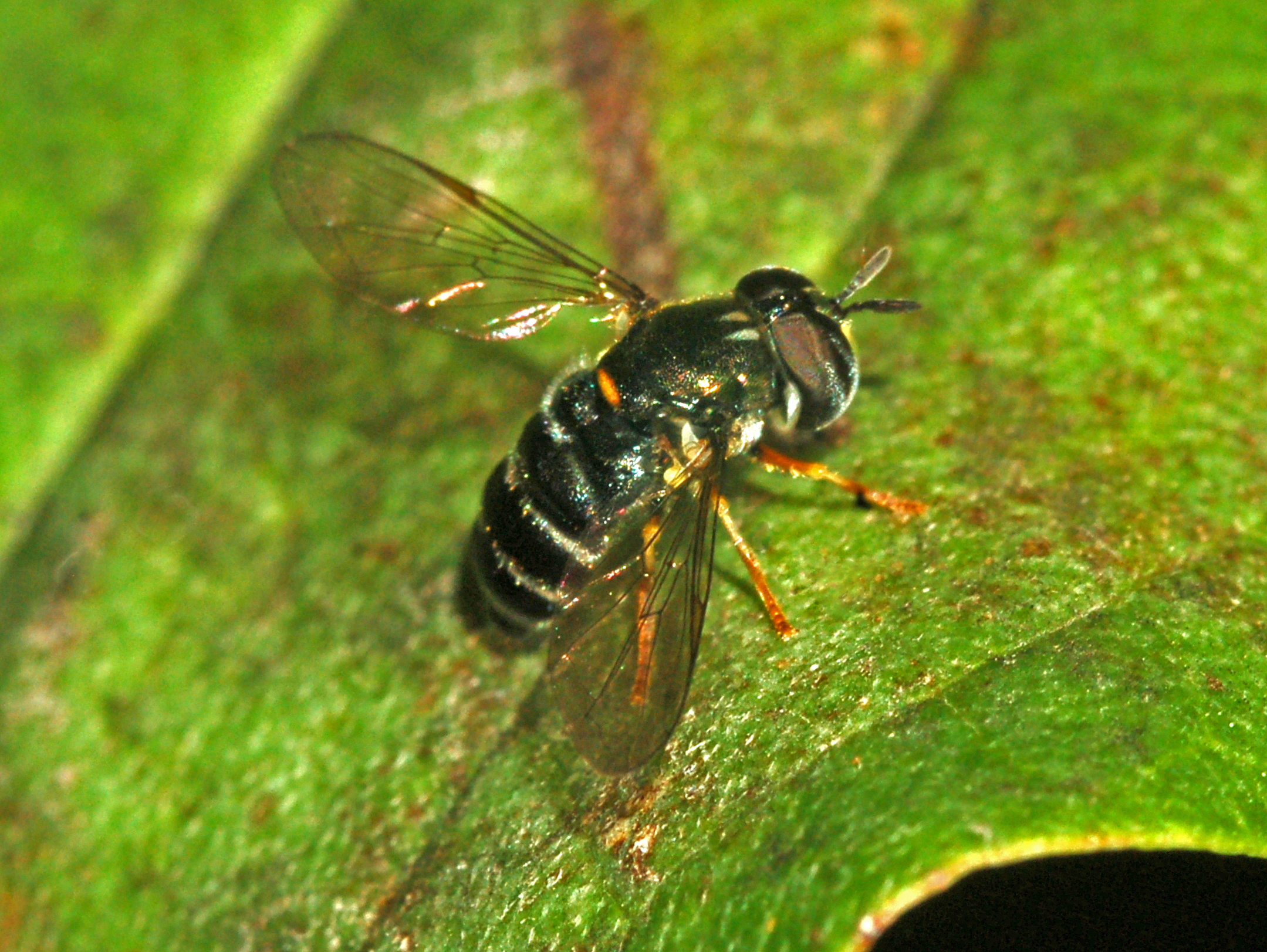
Female of Paragus pecchiolii

== Description ==
Paragus pecchiolii can reach a length of 5.5–6.5 millimetres (0.22–0.26 in). This species shows a black thorax with two dusty stripes and a scutellum with yellow apex. Abdominal tergites are black, with distinct silvery hairy stripes, often reddish along lateral margins. Legs are yellow.

== Distribution ==
This species is present in most of Europe, in the Near East and in North Africa.
