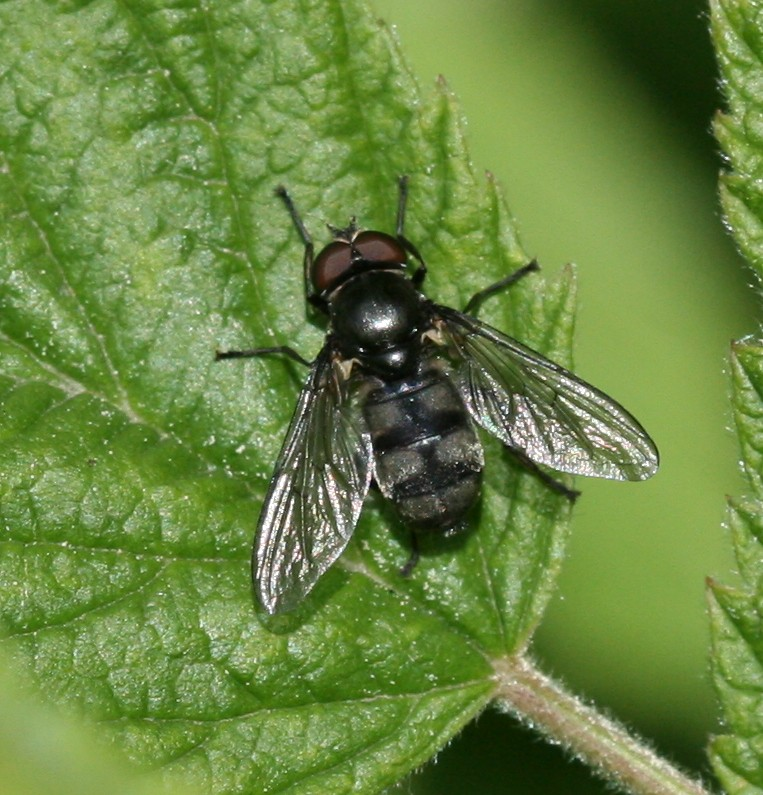
- Portevinia maculata

Scientific classification
- Kingdom: Animalia
- Phylum: Arthropoda
- Class: Insecta
- Order: Diptera
- Family: Syrphidae
- Subfamily: Eristalinae
- Tribe: Rhingiini
- Genus: Portevinia; Goffe, 1944

Synonyms
- Cartosyrphus Portevin, 1927; Cartosyrphus Bigot, 1883

= Portevinia =

Genus of flies

Portevinia is a genus of hoverflies. There is only one European species - P. maculata.

== Species ==
- Portevinia altaica (Stackelberg, 1926)
- Portevinia bashanensis Huo, Ren & Zheng, 2007
- Portevinia dispar (Hervé-Bazin, 1929)
- Portevinia maculata (Fallén, 1817)
