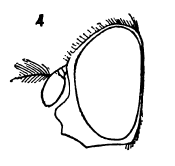
- Hiatomyia cyanescens male

Scientific classification
- Kingdom: Animalia
- Phylum: Arthropoda
- Class: Insecta
- Order: Diptera
- Family: Syrphidae
- Subfamily: Eristalinae
- Tribe: Rhingiini
- Genus: Hiatomyia; Shannon, 1922

Type species
- Chilosia willistoni (Snow, 1895)

= Hiatomyia =

Genus of flies

Hiatomyia is a Holarctic genus of hoverflies that are shiny black with a plumose arista.

== Species ==
- Hiatomyia canadensis (Shannon, 1922)
- Hiatomyia chionthrix Hull & fluke 1950
- Hiatomyia chrysothrix (Hull & Fluke, 1950)
- Hiatomyia coriacea (Hull & Fluke, 1950)
- Hiatomyia cyanea (Hunter, 1896)
- Hiatomyia cyanescens (Loew, 1863)
- Hiatomyia cyascens (Loew, 1863)
- Hiatomyia gemini (Shannon, 1922)
- Hiatomyia hecate (Hull & Fluke, 1950)
- Hiatomyia hyacintha (Hull & Fluke, 1950)
- Hiatomyia idahoa (Shannon, 1922)
- Hiatomyia nigrocyanea (Hull & Fluke, 1950)
- Hiatomyia niveifrons (Hull & Fluke, 1950)
- Hiatomyia nyctichroma (Hull & Fluke, 1950)
- Hiatomyia olivia (Hull & Fluke, 1950)
- Hiatomyia plumosa (Coquillett, 1904)
- Hiatomyia plutonia (Hunter, 1897)
- Hiatomyia rubroflava (Hull & Fluke, 1950)
- Hiatomyia signatiseta (Hunter, 1896)
- Hiatomyia tessa (Hull & Fluke, 1950)
- Hiatomyia townsendi (Hunter, 1896)
- Hiatomyia willistoni (Snow, 1895)
