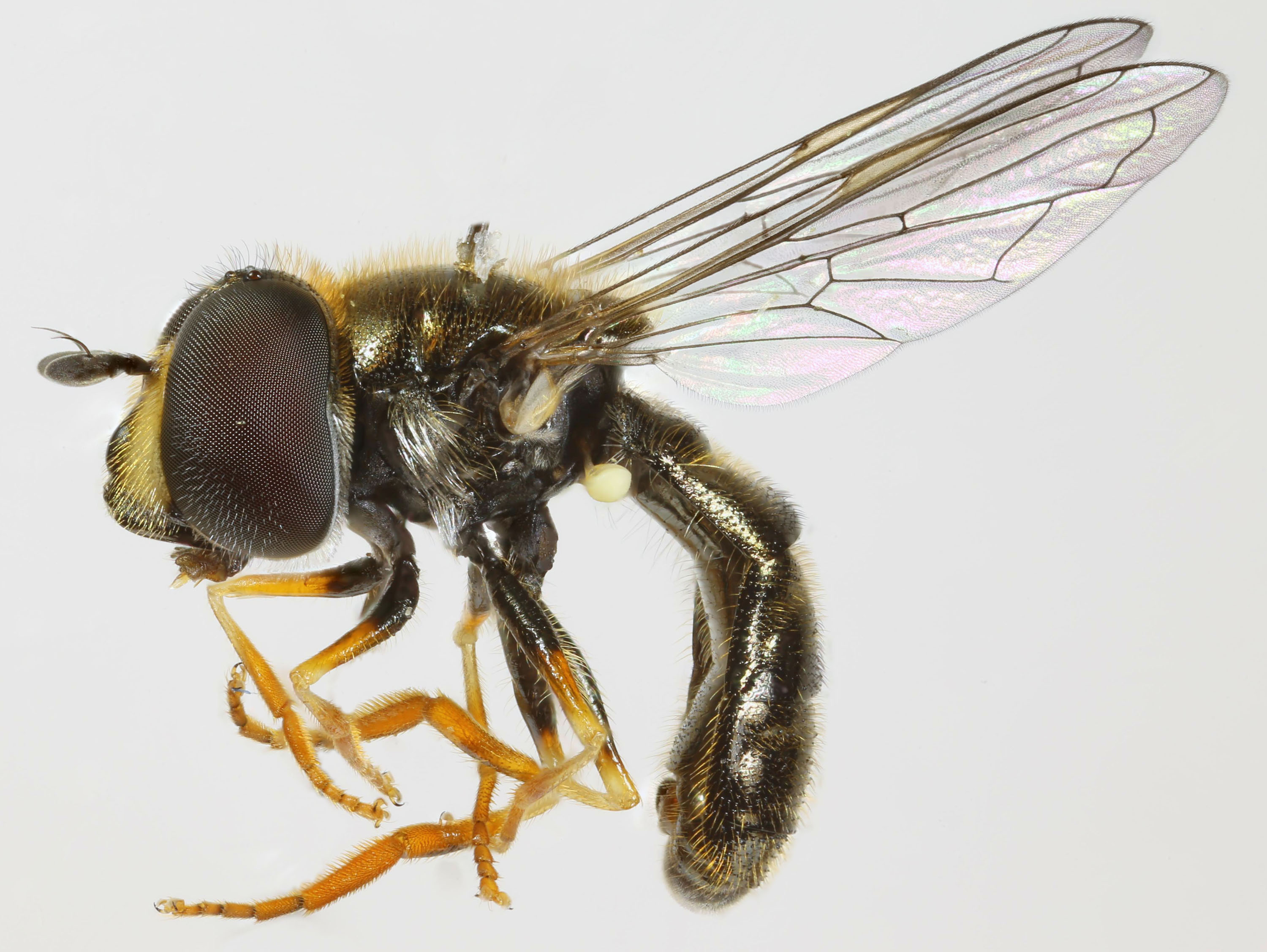

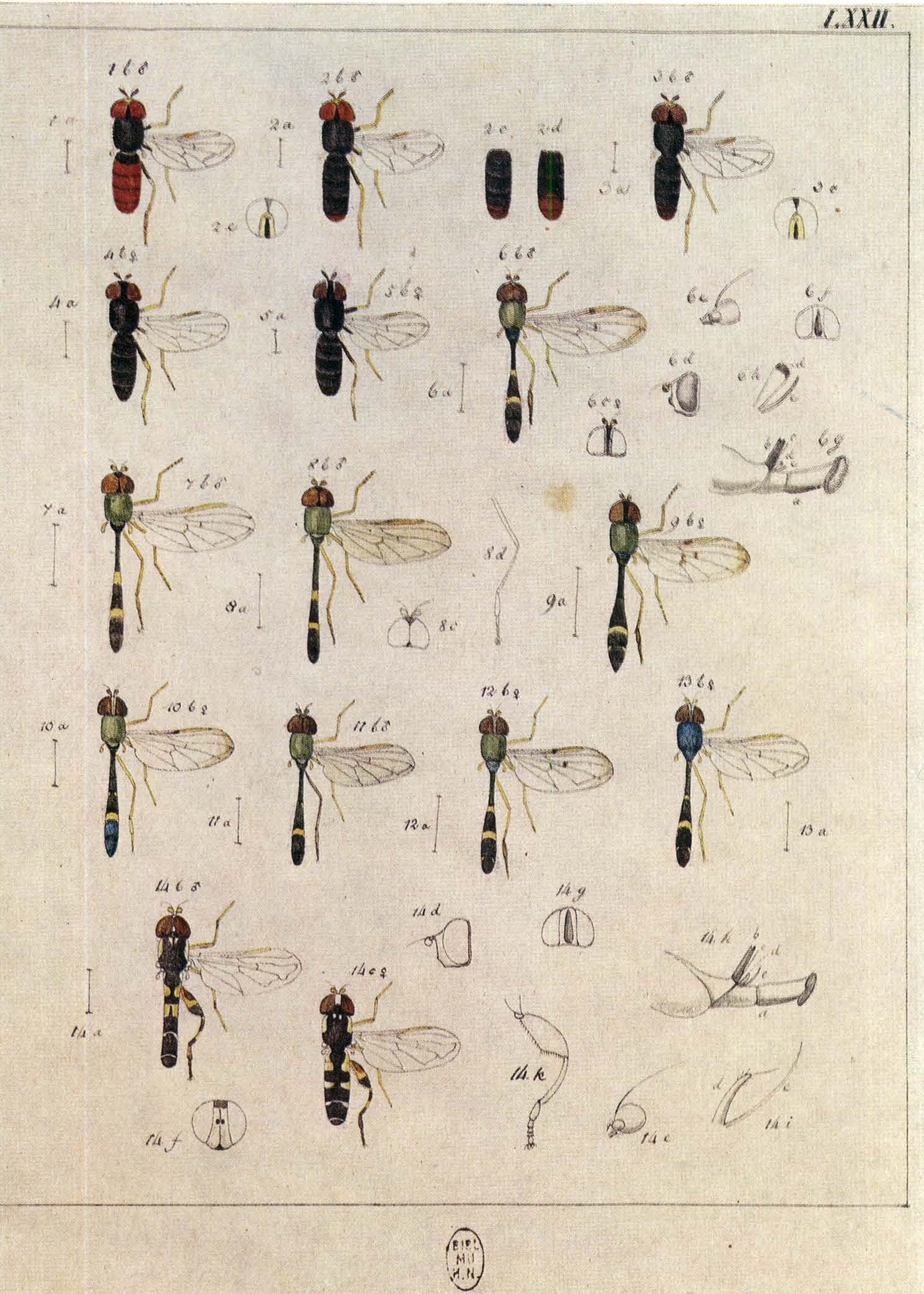
- Original figures in Meigen's Europäischen Zweiflügeligen

Scientific classification
- Kingdom: Animalia
- Phylum: Arthropoda
- Class: Insecta
- Order: Diptera
- Family: Syrphidae
- Genus: Paragus
- Subgenus: Pandasyophthalmus
- Species: P. haemorrhous

Binomial name
- Paragus haemorrhous Meigen, 1822

Synonyms
- Paragus auricaudatus Bigot, 1884; Paragus coreanus Shiraki, 1930; Paragus dimidiatus Loew, 1863; Paragus femoratus Walker, 1851; Paragus haemorrhous Meigen, 1822; Paragus obscurus Walker, 1851; Paragus ogasawarae Matsumura, 1916; Paragus pallipes Matsumura, 1916; Paragus sigillatus Curtis, 1836; Paragus substitutus Loew, 1858; Paragus tamagawanus Matsumura, 1916; Paragus trianguliferus Zetterstedt, 1838

= Paragus haemorrhous =

Species of fly

Paragus haemorrhous, the black-backed grass skimmer is a common widespread species of hoverfly found in many parts of Europe, Africa and the Nearctic. Hoverflies can remain nearly motionless in flight. The adults are also known as flower flies for they are commonly found on flowers from which they get both energy-giving nectar and protein-rich pollen. The larvae are predators on aphids.

== Description ==
For terminology Speight key to genera and glossary
external link to inaturalist images

Size

4.3–5.9 mm (0.17–0.23 in)

Head

The face is yellow, moderately projecting, with a black median stripe in both sexes. The third antennal joint is sordid reddish below. The eyes are uniformly pilose."

Thorax

The scutellum entirely black.

Abdomen

Segment 1 is black and well-developed. Segment 2 is black or has a posterior margin that is red. Segments 3 through 5 are usually entirely red-orange to dark red in males. The superior lobe varies in shape and size, with an apex that is nearly truncate to strongly oblique, and with a length from one to two times that of the surstylus.

Wings

The wings are hyaline with a brownish grey stigma.

Legs

The legs are yellow and light brownish yellow. The basal half of the femora are black. The hind tibia is usually with apical half yellow-orange.
Females cannot be identified.

See references for determination.

== Distribution ==
Palearctic: Fennoscandia south to Iberia and the Mediterranean basin, Israel and Turkey, Ireland eastward through Central Europe and Southern Europe (Italy, the former Yugoslavia) into European Russia. Nearctic: from the Yukon south to Costa Rica also in parts of the Afrotropical region.

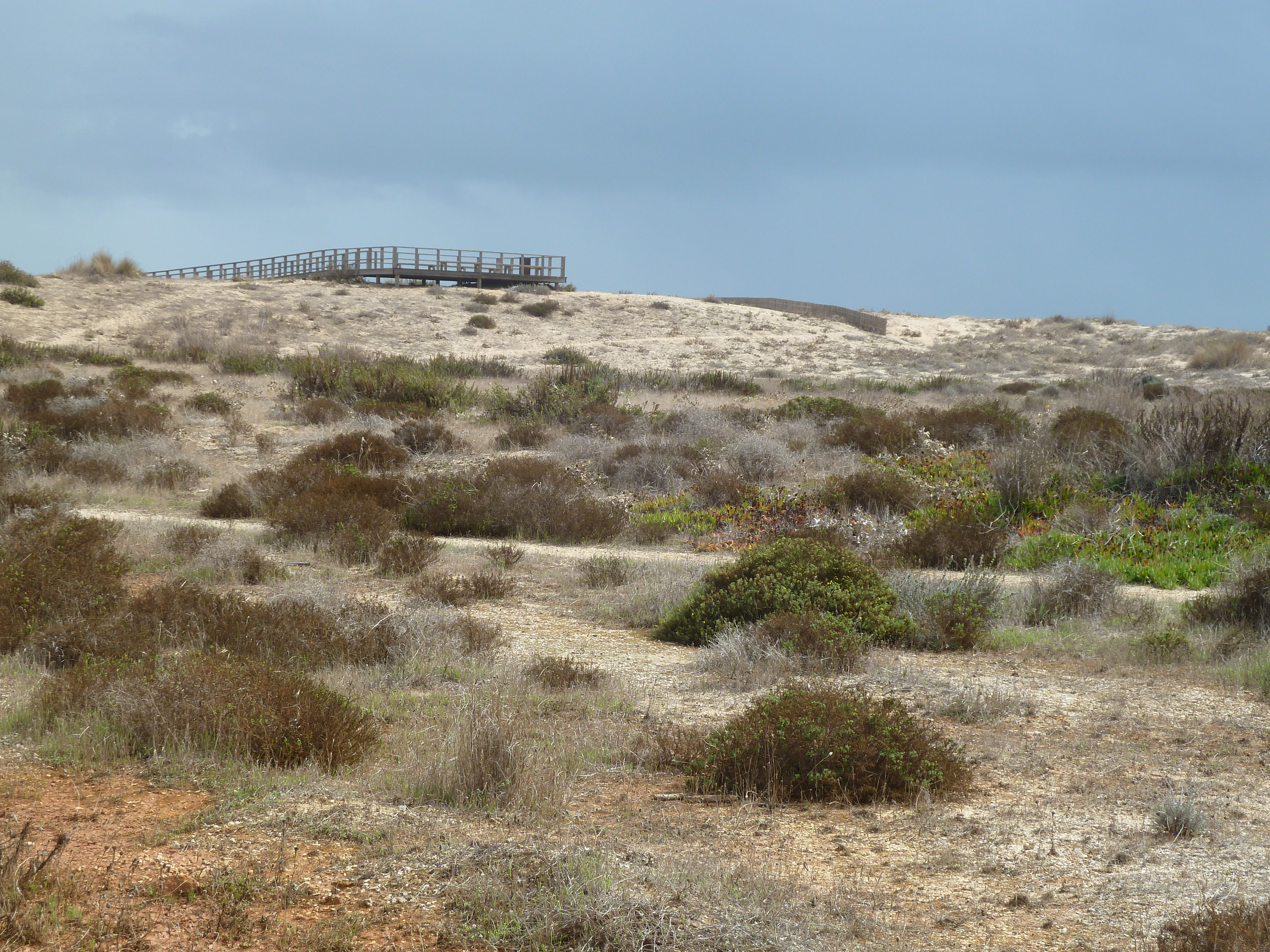
Habitat: Portugal.

== Biology ==
Habitat: Unimproved grassland, heathland, garrigue, dune grassland, open areas and pathsides in forest up to the Larix/Pinus uncinata zone, fen meadow. Flowers visited include umbellifers, Calluna, Jasione montana, Matricaria, Origanum, Polygonum, Potentilla, Solidago, Stellaria. It flies May to September. The larva feeds on aphids on low herbaceous plants.

== Molecular genetics ==
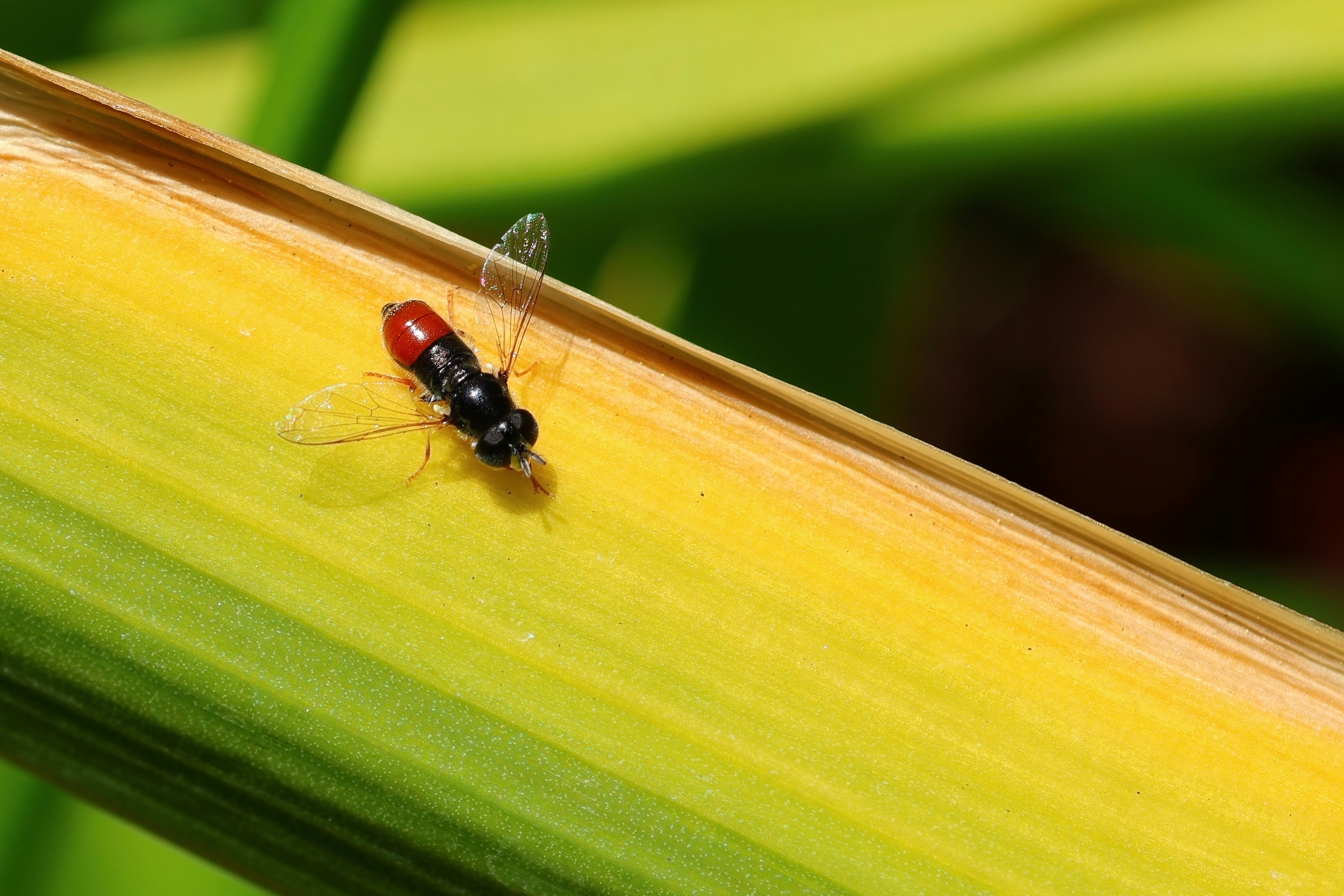
Black-backed Grass Skimmer

As "based on both morphological and molecular evidence", Paragus haemorrhous Meigen 1822, Paragus coadunatus (Rondani, 1847) and Paragus ascoensis Goeldlin de Tiefenau & Lucas, 1981 appear to be synonyms of Paragus tibialis (Fallén, 1817)". Rojo et al. (2006).
