= Hiatomyia gemini =

Scientific classification
- Kingdom: Animalia
- Phylum: Arthropoda
- Class: Insecta
- Order: Diptera
- Family: Syrphidae
- Genus: Hiatomyia
- Species: H. gemini

Binomial name
- Hiatomyia gemini (Shannon, 1922)

Species of insect

Hiatomyia cyanea, the mountain deltawing, is a rare species of syrphid fly observed in the northwestern United States .Hoverflies can remain nearly motionless in flight. The adults are also known as flower flies for they are commonly found on flowers from which they get both energy-giving nectar and protein-rich pollen. The larvae are unknown.
