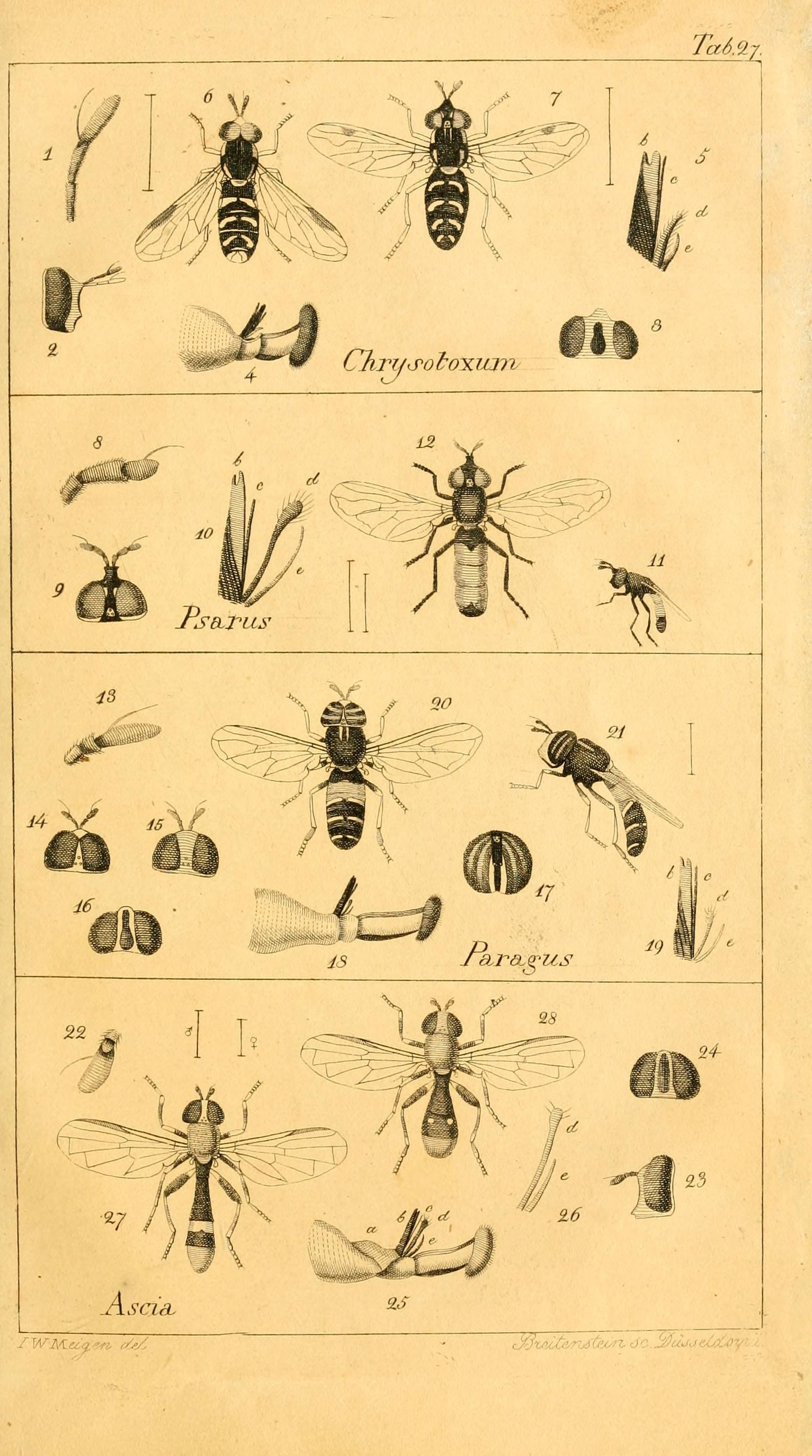
- Psarus in Meigen Systematische Beschreibung der bekannten europäischen zweiflügeligen Insekten 1822

Scientific classification
- Kingdom: Animalia
- Phylum: Arthropoda
- Class: Insecta
- Order: Diptera
- Family: Syrphidae
- Genus: Psarus; Latreille, 1804
- Species: P. abdominalis

Binomial name
- Psarus abdominalis (Fabricius, 1794)

Synonyms
- Species synonymy: Musca coalescens Geoffroy, 1785; Psarus arcuatus Macquart, 1834; Syrphus abdominalis Fabricius, 1794

= Psarus =

Species of fly

Psarus is a monotypic genus of hoverfly endemic to Europe. Its only species, Psarus abdominalis is 8.5–10 mm long. The body and head are glossy black. The frons has a distinct tubercle. The elongate antennae are porrect, with the arista on the apical half of the third segment. The abdominal tergites are extensively orange. Psarus abdominalis occurs from France in the west to European Russia in the east, and from the Baltic in the north to Greece in the south. It is now locally extinct and threatened. The habitat of the species is forest landscape and mixed agricultural landscape (bocage).

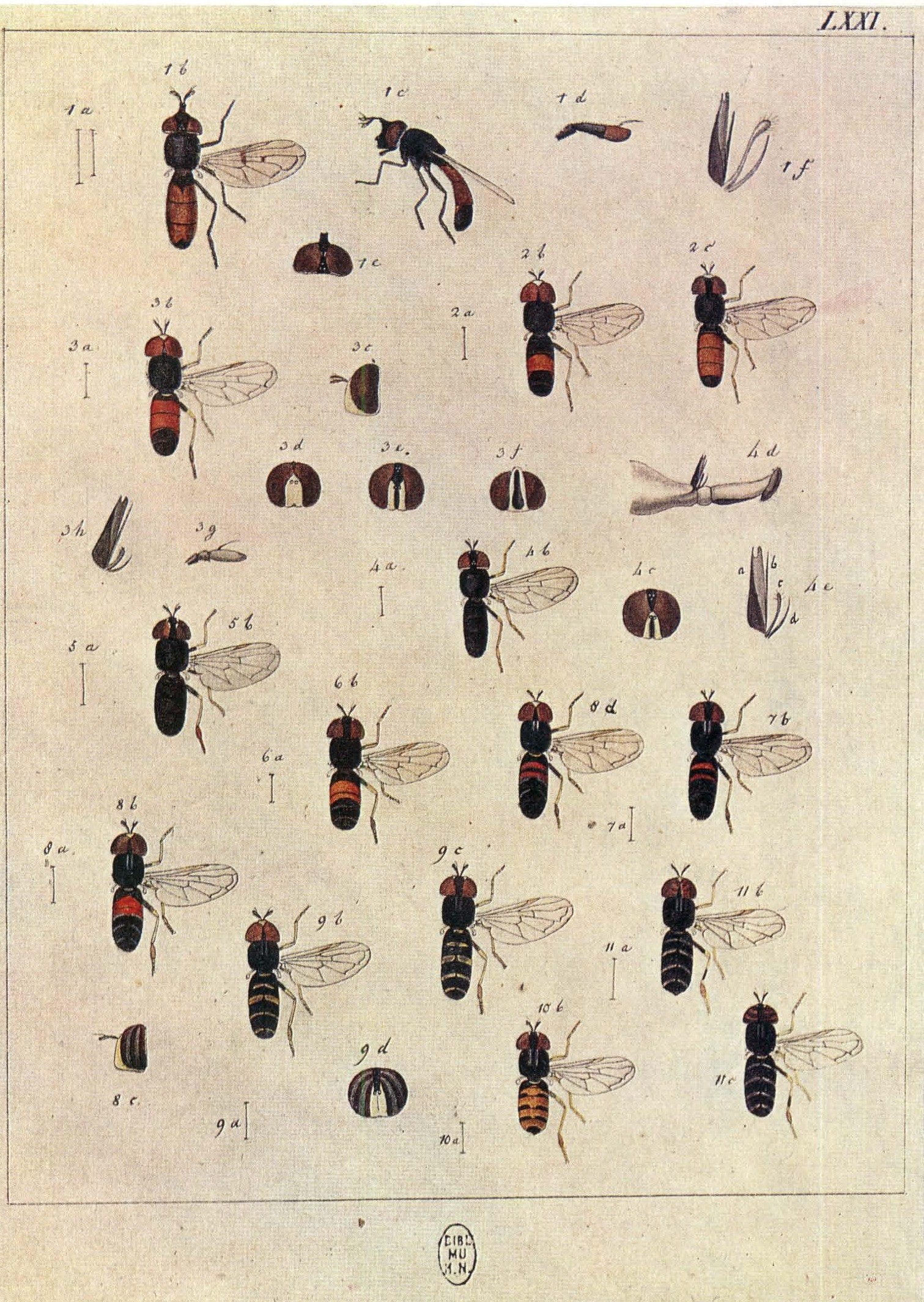
another Meigen illustration (figure 1) the remaining illustrations are of Paragus species

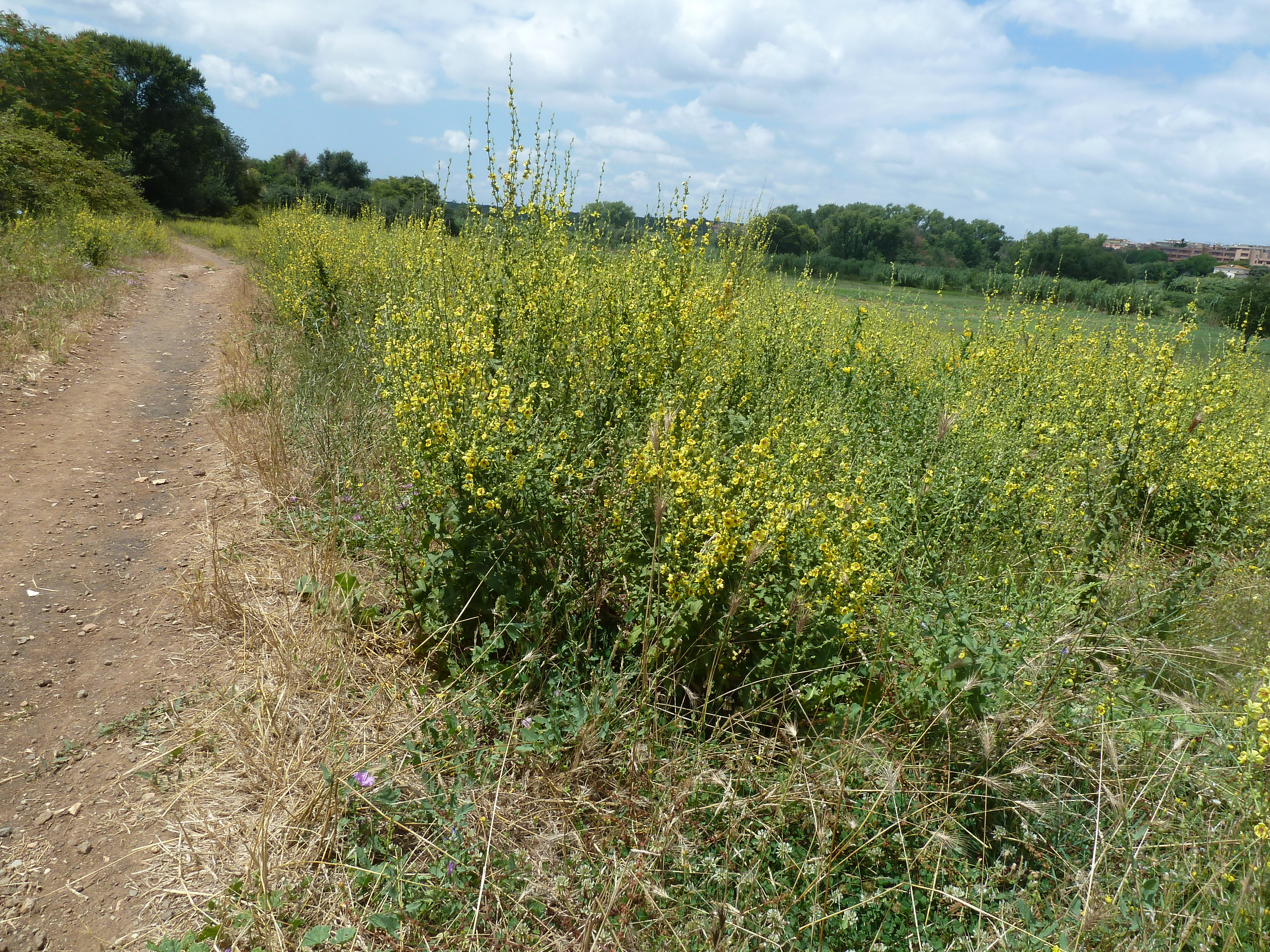
Habitat Parco della Caffarella, Rome

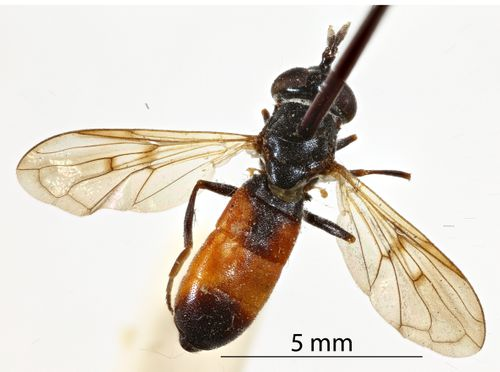
syntype
