= Paragus angustistylus =

Scientific classification
- Kingdom: Animalia
- Phylum: Arthropoda
- Class: Insecta
- Order: Diptera
- Family: Syrphidae
- Subfamily: Syrphinae
- Tribe: Syrphini
- Genus: Paragus
- Species: P. angustistylus

Binomial name
- Paragus angustistylus Vockeroth, 1986

Species of fly

Paragus angustistylus, the thin-spined grass skimmer, is a rare species of syrphid fly observed in the Great Lakes Region. Hoverflies can remain nearly motionless in flight, and the adults are also known as flower flies for they are commonly found on flowers, from which they get both energy-giving nectar and protein-rich pollen.
