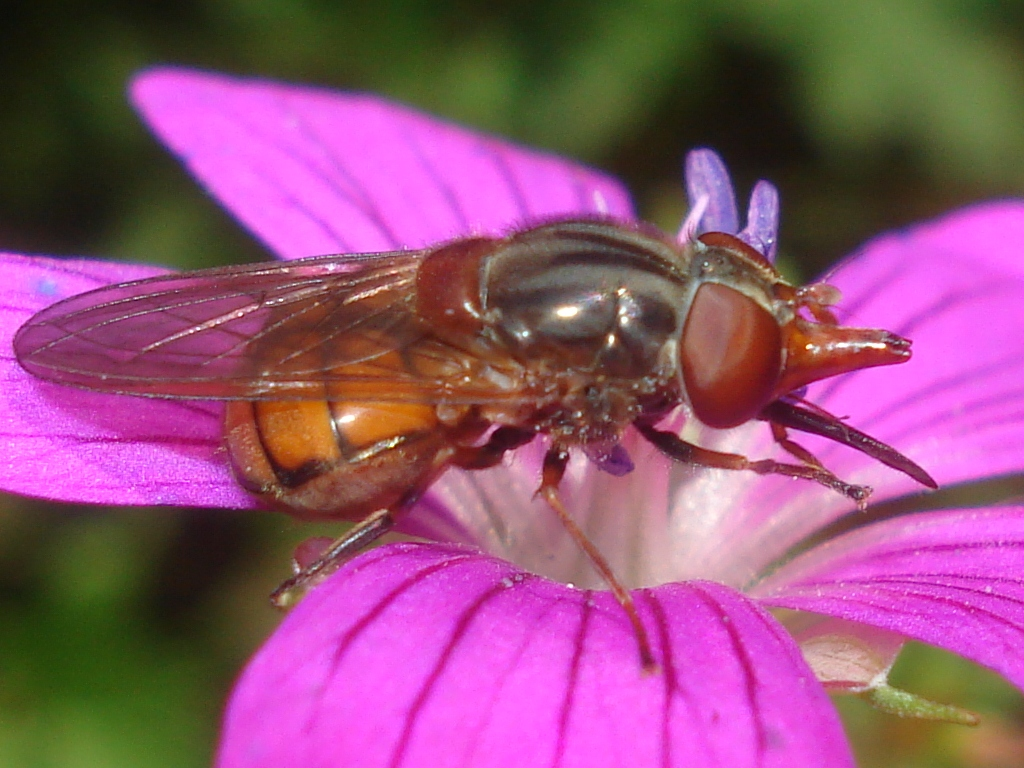
- Rhingia campestris female

Scientific classification
- Kingdom: Animalia
- Phylum: Arthropoda
- Class: Insecta
- Order: Diptera
- Family: Syrphidae
- Tribe: Rhingiini
- Genus: Rhingia; Scopoli, 1763

Type species
- Conops rostrata Linnaeus, 1758

= Rhingia =

Genus of flies

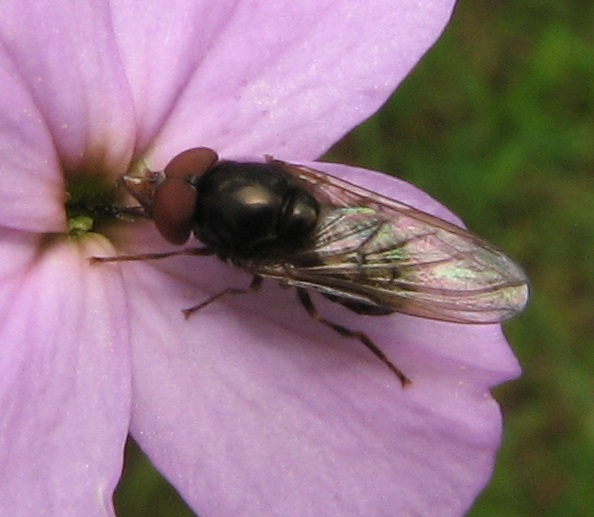
Rhingia nasica male

Rhingia is a genus of hoverflies. They all have a very distinctive long snout. The larvae are associated with animal dung. Adults feed on nectar and pollen.

== Species ==
- R. austriaca Meigen, 1830
- R. borealis Ringdahl 1928
- R. caerulescens Loew, 1858
- R. campestris Meigen, 1822
- R. cnephaeoptera Speiser, 1915
- R. coerulea Bezzi, 1912
- R. congensis Curran, 1939
- R. cuthbertsoni Curran, 1939
- R. cyanoprora Speiser, 1910
- R. formosana Shiraki, 1930
- R. fuscipes Bezzi, 1915
- R. laevigata Loew, 1858
- R. lutea Bezzi, 1915
- R. mecyana Speiser, 1910
- R. nasica Say, 1823
- R. nigra Macquart, 1845
- R. orthoneurina Speiser, 1910
- R. pellucens Bezzi, 1915
- R. pulcherrima Bezzi, 1908
- R. pycnosoma Bezzi, 1915
- R. rostrata (Linnaeus, 1758)
- R. saskana Szilády, 1943
- R. semicaerulea Austen, 1893
- R. trivittata Curran, 1929
