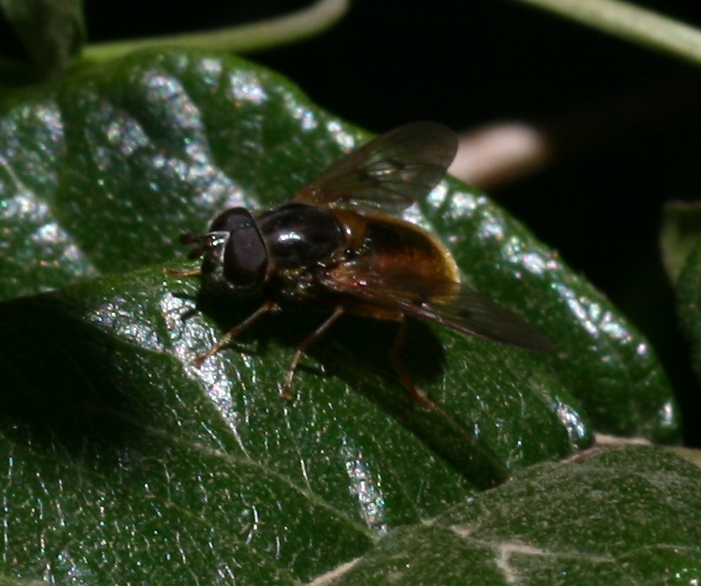

Scientific classification
- Kingdom: Animalia
- Phylum: Arthropoda
- Class: Insecta
- Order: Diptera
- Family: Syrphidae
- Genus: Ferdinandea
- Species: F. croesus

Binomial name
- Ferdinandea croesus (Osten Sacken, 1877)

Synonyms
- Chrysochlamys croesus Osten Sacken, 1877; Ferdinandea midas Hull, 1942

= Ferdinandea croesus =

Species of fly

Ferdinandea croesus is a species of syrphid fly, in the family Syrphidae.
