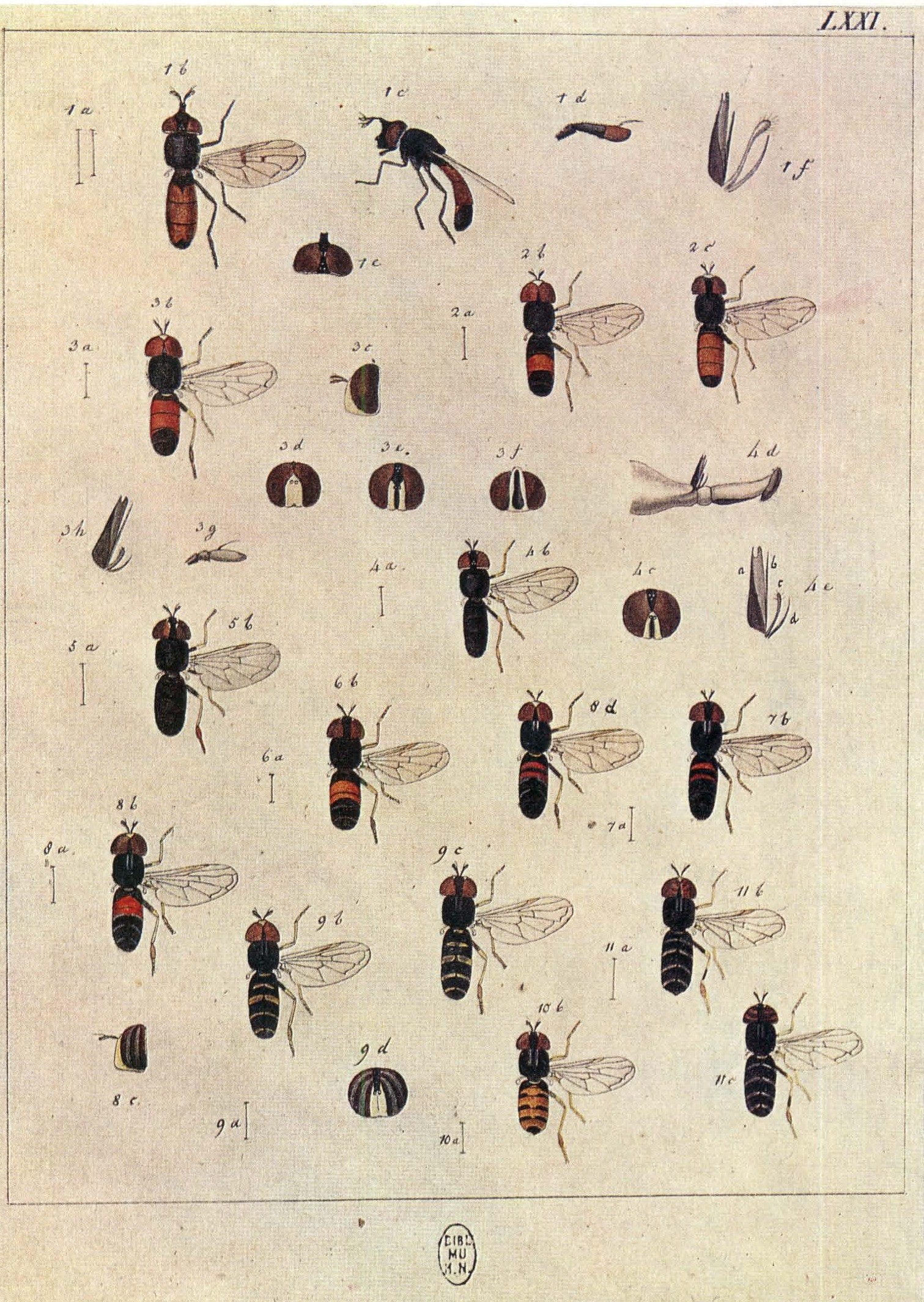
- Paragus albifrons figure in Johann Wilhelm Meigen Europäischen Zweiflügeligen

Scientific classification
- Kingdom: Animalia
- Phylum: Arthropoda
- Class: Insecta
- Order: Diptera
- Family: Syrphidae
- Genus: Paragus
- Species: P. albifrons

Binomial name
- Paragus albifrons (Fallén, 1817)

Synonyms

= Paragus albifrons =

Species of fly

Paragus albifrons, is a species of hoverfly. It is found from southern Europe across to eastern Asia.

According to a 2014 review of the scarce and threatened Syrphid flies of Great Britain, Paragus albifrons is critically endangered and has undergone a dramatic range contraction.
