= Hiatomyia cyanea =

Scientific classification
- Kingdom: Animalia
- Phylum: Arthropoda
- Class: Insecta
- Order: Diptera
- Family: Syrphidae
- Genus: Hiatomyia
- Species: H. cyanea

Binomial name
- Hiatomyia cyanea (Hunter, 1896)

Synonyms
- Chilosia cyanea (HUNTER, 1896); Chilosia nigrocoerulea Lovett, 1921; Chilosia pacifica Lovett, 1919

Species of insect

Hiatomyia cyanea, the azure deltawing, is a rare species of syrphid fly observed in the northeastern United States. Hoverflies can remain nearly motionless in flight. The adults are also known as flower flies for they are commonly found on flowers from which they get both energy-giving nectar and protein-rich pollen. The larvae are unknown.
