= Paragus angustifrons =

Scientific classification
- Kingdom: Animalia
- Phylum: Arthropoda
- Class: Insecta
- Order: Diptera
- Family: Syrphidae
- Genus: Paragus
- Species: P. angustifrons

Binomial name
- Paragus angustifrons Loew, 1863

Species of fly

Paragus angustifrons, the narrow-faced grass skimmer, is an uncommon species of fly observed throughout North America. Hoverflies can remain nearly motionless in flight. The adults are also known as flower flies for they are commonly found on flowers from which they get both energy-giving nectar and protein-rich pollen. The larvae have been reared from Aphis spiraecola and Aphis spiraephila.
