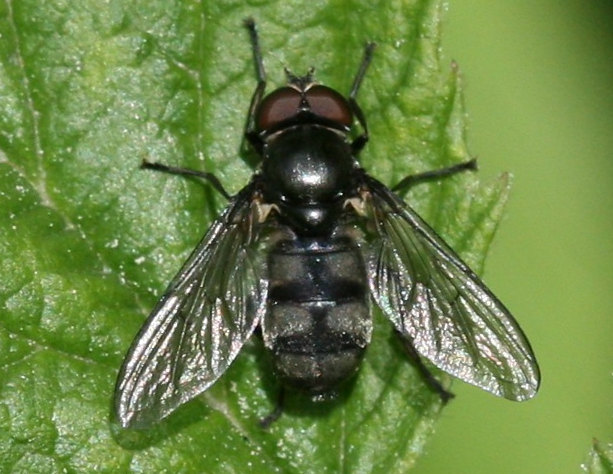
- Portevinia maculata (male)
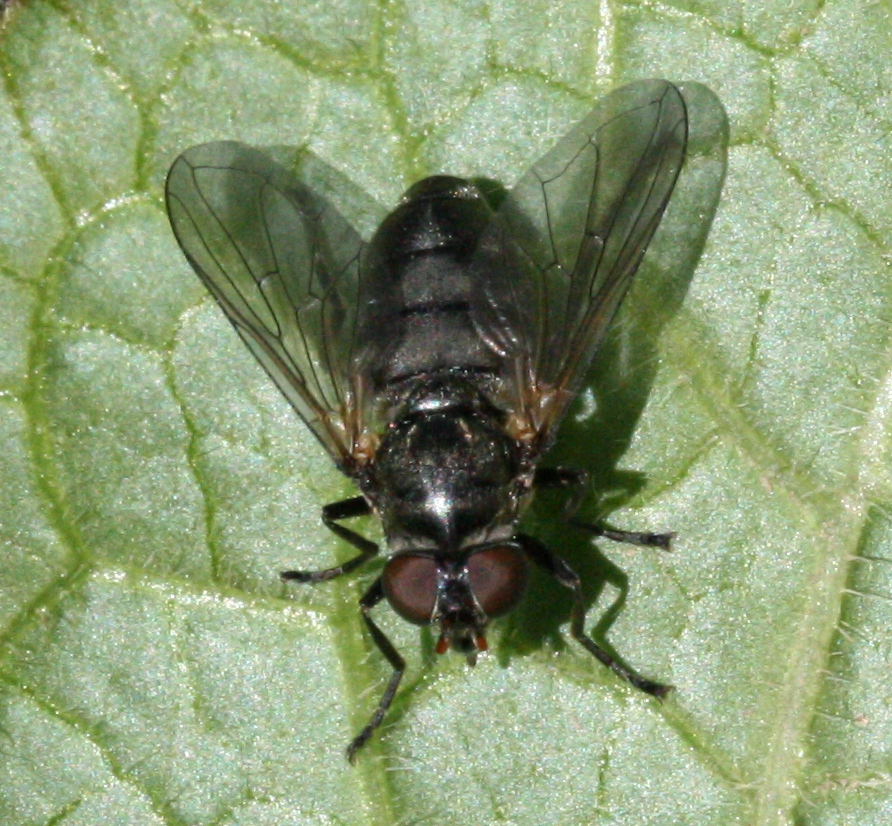
- Portevinia maculata (female)

Conservation status
- Least Concern (IUCN 3.1)

Scientific classification
- Kingdom: Animalia
- Phylum: Arthropoda
- Class: Insecta
- Order: Diptera
- Family: Syrphidae
- Genus: Portevinia
- Species: P. maculata

Binomial name
- Portevinia maculata (Fallén, 1817)

= Portevinia maculata =

Species of fly

Portevinia maculata, also known as the ramsons hoverfly, is a European species of hoverfly. The adults can be found around Allium species when the plants are in flower (May–June). The larvae tunnel through and overwinter in the bulbs of this plant.

== Description ==
External images For terms see Morphology of Diptera
Tergites 2-4 with grey spots. Face very concave for upper two-thirds. Antennae red. See references for determination

== Distribution ==
Palearctic Southern Norway to North Spain. Ireland East into Northern Europe and Central Europe as far as Liechtenstein, Austria and northern Italy.

It can be found in the following countries: Austria, Belgium, Czechia, Denmark, France, Germany, Ireland, Italy, Liechtenstein, Montenegro, Netherlands, Norway, Poland, Romania, Slovakia, Spain, Sweden, Switzerland, Ukraine and the United Kingdom.

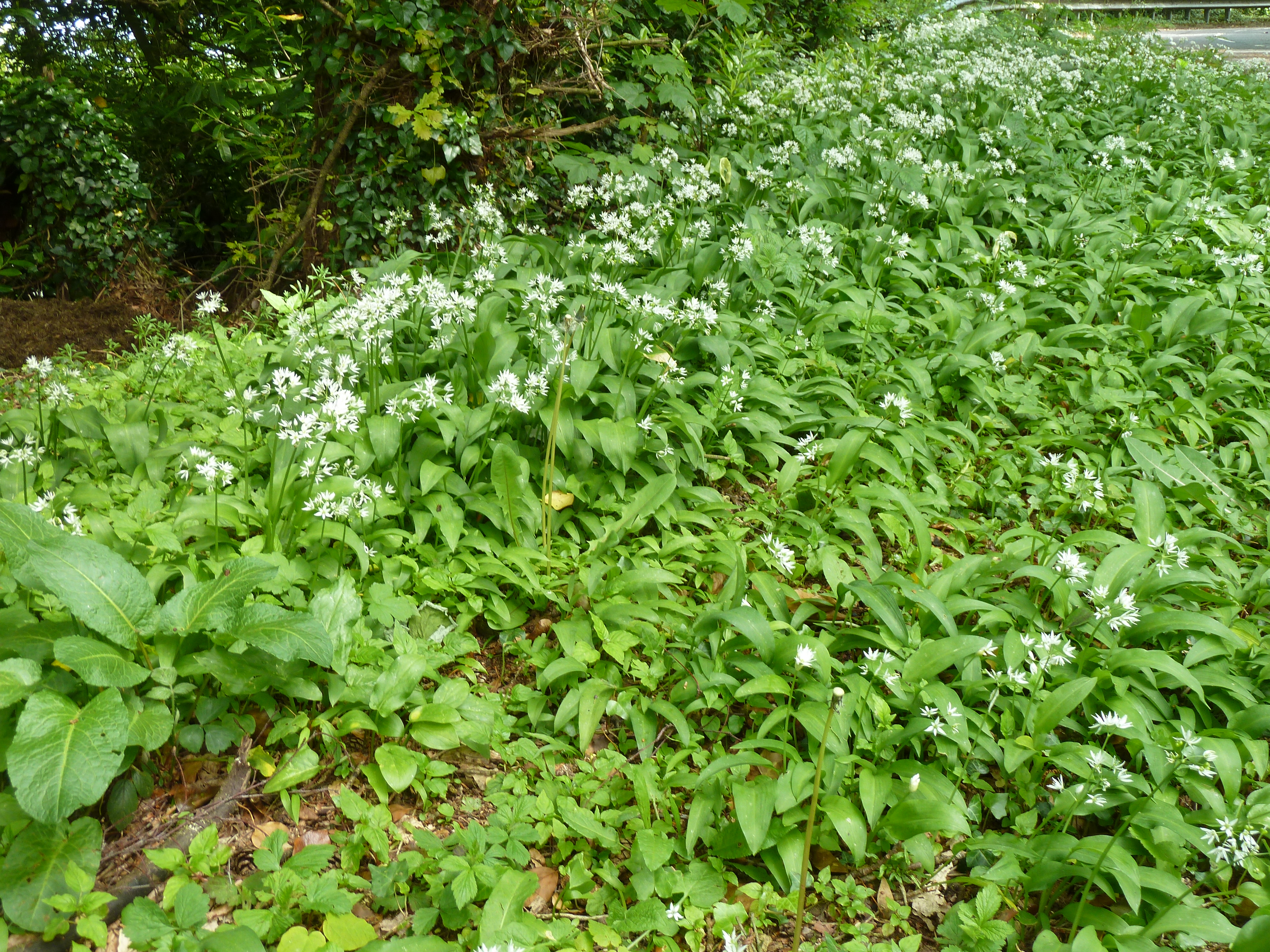
Habitat in Ireland

== Habitat ==
Portevinia maculata lives in deciduous woodland glades where Allium ursinum or Allium triquetrum also grow. It can be found at elevations up to 2,000 metres (6,560 ft) above sea level.
