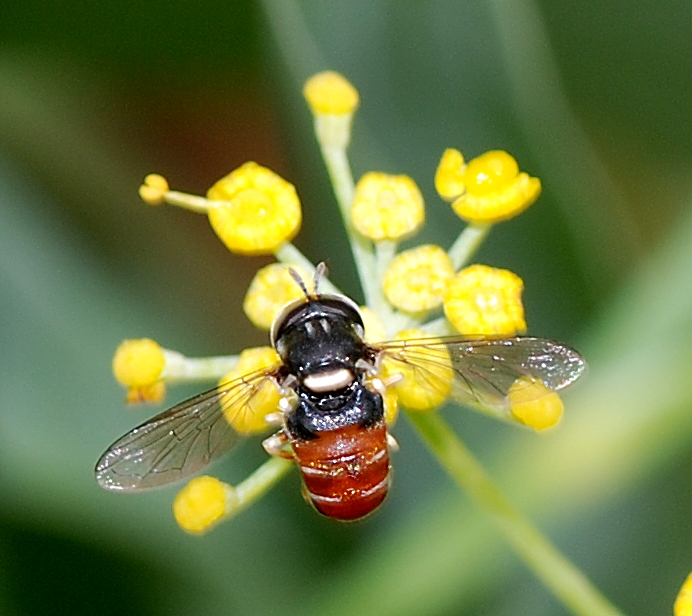
- Paragus sp

Scientific classification
- Kingdom: Animalia
- Phylum: Arthropoda
- Class: Insecta
- Order: Diptera
- Family: Syrphidae
- Subfamily: Syrphinae
- Tribe: Syrphini
- Genus: Paragus; Latreille, 1804

Type species
- Syrphus bicolor Fabricius, 1794

= Paragus =

Genus of flies

Paragus sp. feeding on Tanacetum vulgare.

Paragus is a genus of hoverflies.

== Species ==
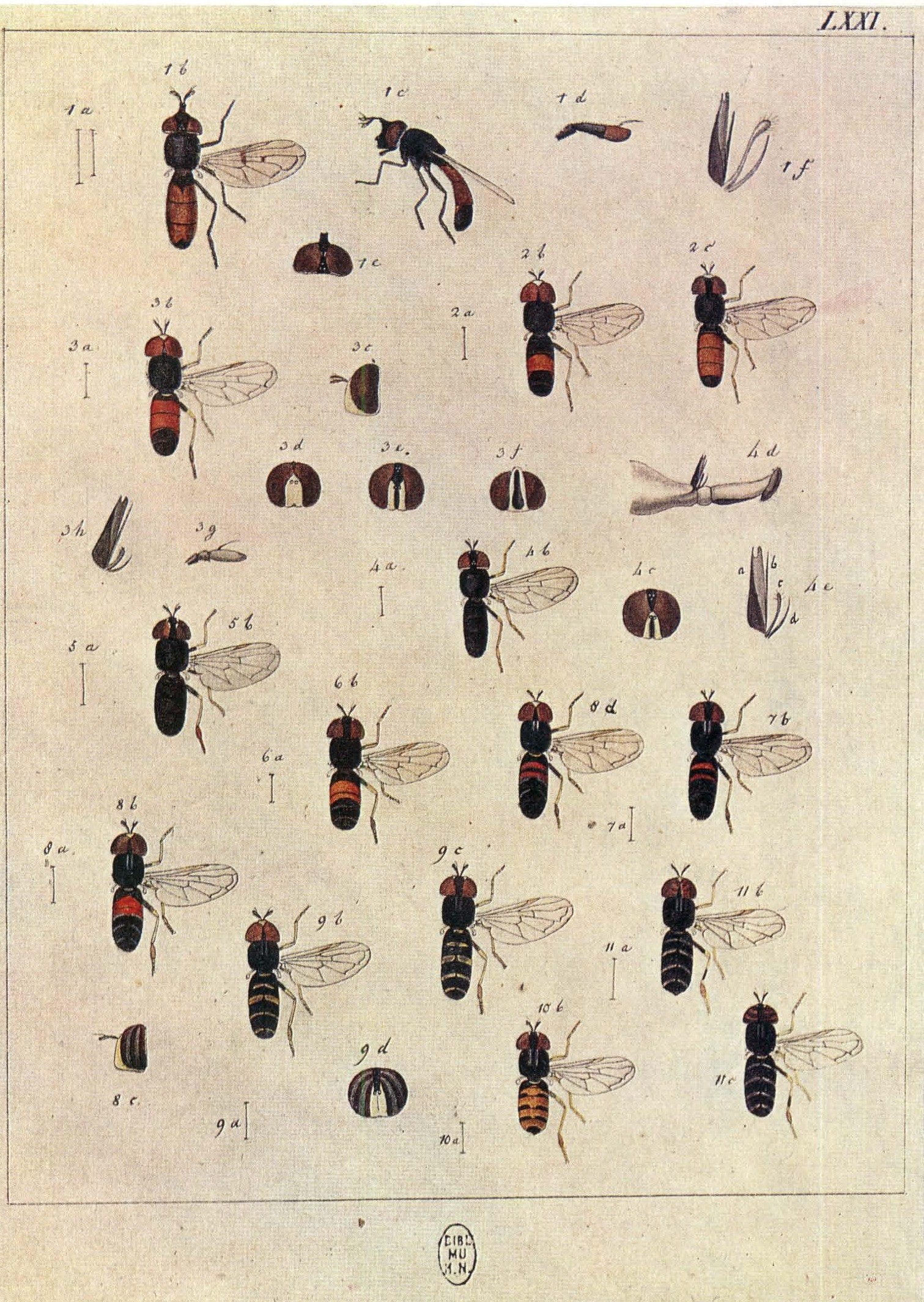
Paragus in Johann Wilhelm Meigen Europäischen Zweiflügeligen

Subgenus: Afroparagus Vujić & Radenković, 2008

- P. borbonicus Macquart, 1842
- P. caligneus Ssymank & Mengual, 2014

Subgenus: Pandasyopthalmus Stuckenberg, 1954

- P. ascoensis Goeldlin, 1981
- P. atratus Meijere, 1906
- P. basilewskyi Doesburg, 1955
- P. chalybeatus Hull, 1964
- P. coadunatus Rondani, 1847
- P. dolichocerus Bezzi, 1915
- P. gracilis Stuckenberg, 1954
- P. haemorrhous Meigen, 1822
- P. jozanus Matsumura, 1916
- P. longiventris Loew, 1858
- P. marshalli Bezzi, 1915
- P. minutus Hull, 1964
- P. naso Stuckenberg, 1954
- P. nasutus Bezzi, 1915
- P. nigrocoeruleus Hull, 1949
- P. politus Wiedemann, 1830
- P. punctatus Hull, 1949
- P. tibialis (Fallén, 1817)

Subgenus: Paragus Latreille, 1804

- P. bicolor (Fabricius, 1794)
- P. bispinosus Vockeroth, 1986
- P. cooverti Vockeroth, 1986
- P. quadrifasciatus Meigen, 1822
- P. variabilis Vockeroth, 1986

Subgenus: Serratoparagus Vujić & Radenković, 2008

- P. crenulatus Thompson, 1869
- P. pusillus Stuckenberg, 1954

In need of organisation

- P. absidatus Goeldlin, 1971
- P. albifrons (Fallén, 1817)
- P. albipes Gimmerthal, 1842
- P. ambalaensis Sodhi & Singh, 1991
- P. angustifrons Loew, 1863
- P. angustistylus Vockeroth, 1986
- P. arizonensis Vockeroth, 1986
- P. asiaticus Peck, 1979
- P. bradescui Stanescu, 1981
- P. cinctus Schiner & Egger, 1853
- P. clausseni Mutin, 1999
- P. compeditus Wiedemann, 1830
- P. constrictus Simic, 1986
- P. dauricus Mutin, 1999
- P. finitimus Goeldlin, 1971
- P. flammeus Goeldlin, 1971
- P. glumaci Vujic, Simic & Radenkovic, 1999
- P. hermonensis Kaplan, 1981
- P. hyalopteri Marcos-Garcia & Rojo, 1994
- P. kitincheevi Barkalov & Goguzokov, 2001
- P. kopdagensis Claussen, 1997
- P. leleji Mutin, 1985
- P. longistylus Vockeroth, 1986
- P. majoranae Rondani, 1857
- P. medeae Stanescu, 1991
- P. oltenicus Stanescu, 1877
- P. oltenicus Stanescu, 1977
- P. pecchiolii Rondani, 1857
- P. punctulatus Zetterstedt, 1838
- P. romanicus Stanescu, 1992
- P. sexarcuatus Bigot, 1862
- P. strigatus Meigen, 1822
- P. vandergooti Marcos-Garcia, 1986
