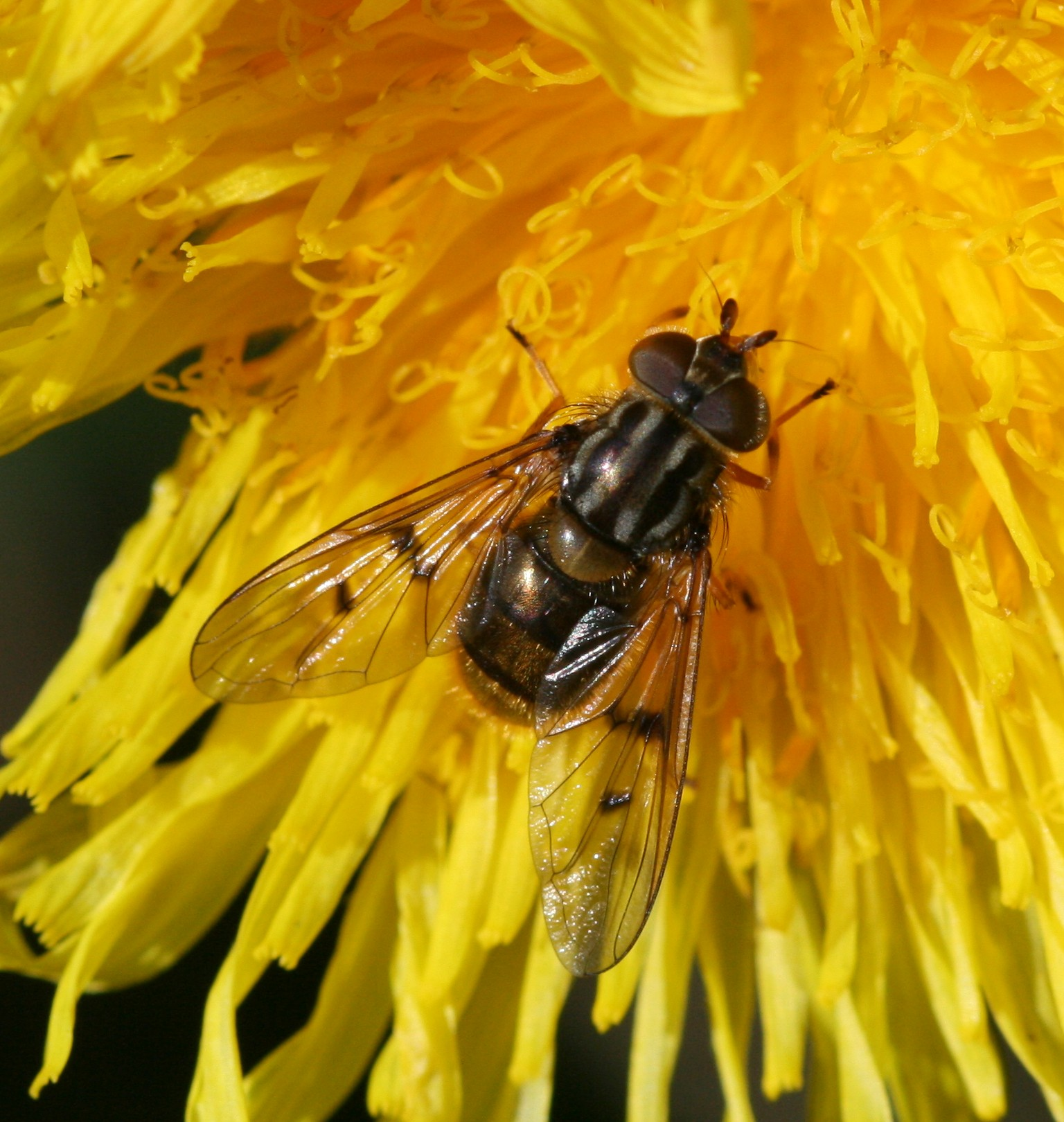
- Ferdinandea cuprea female

Scientific classification
- Domain: Eukaryota
- Kingdom: Animalia
- Phylum: Arthropoda
- Class: Insecta
- Order: Diptera
- Family: Syrphidae
- Subfamily: Eristalinae
- Tribe: Rhingiini
- Genus: Ferdinandea; Rondani, 1844

Type species
- Conops cuprea Scopoli, 1763

Synonyms
- Chrysochlamys Rondani, 1856; Chrysoclamis Rondani, 1851

= Ferdinandea (fly) =

Genus of flies

Ferdinandea is a genus of syrphid flies or hoverflies in the family Syrphidae. There are about 16 described species in Ferdinandea.

== Species ==
These 16 species belong to the genus Ferdinandea:

- Ferdinandea aeneicolor Shannon, 1924
- Ferdinandea aurea Rondani, 1844
- Ferdinandea buccata (Loew, 1863)
- Ferdinandea croesus (Osten Sacken, 1877)
- Ferdinandea cuprea (Scopoli, 1763)
- Ferdinandea dives (Osten Sacken, 1877)
- Ferdinandea formosana Shiraki, 1930
- Ferdinandea fumipennis Kassebeer, 1999
- Ferdinandea isabella Hull, 1942
- Ferdinandea longifacies Coe, 1964
- Ferdinandea luteola Mutin, 1999
- Ferdinandea maculipennis Curran, 1928
- Ferdinandea montana Hull, 1942
- Ferdinandea nepalensis Claussen & Weipert, 2003
- Ferdinandea nigripes (Osten Sacken, 1877)
- Ferdinandea ruficornis (Fabricius, 1775)
