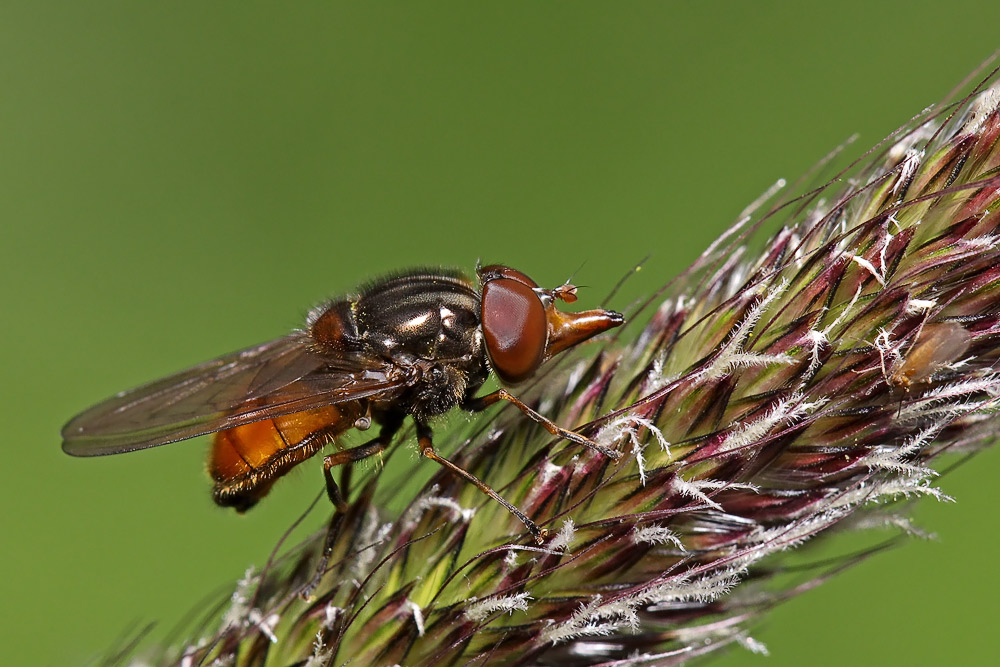
- male
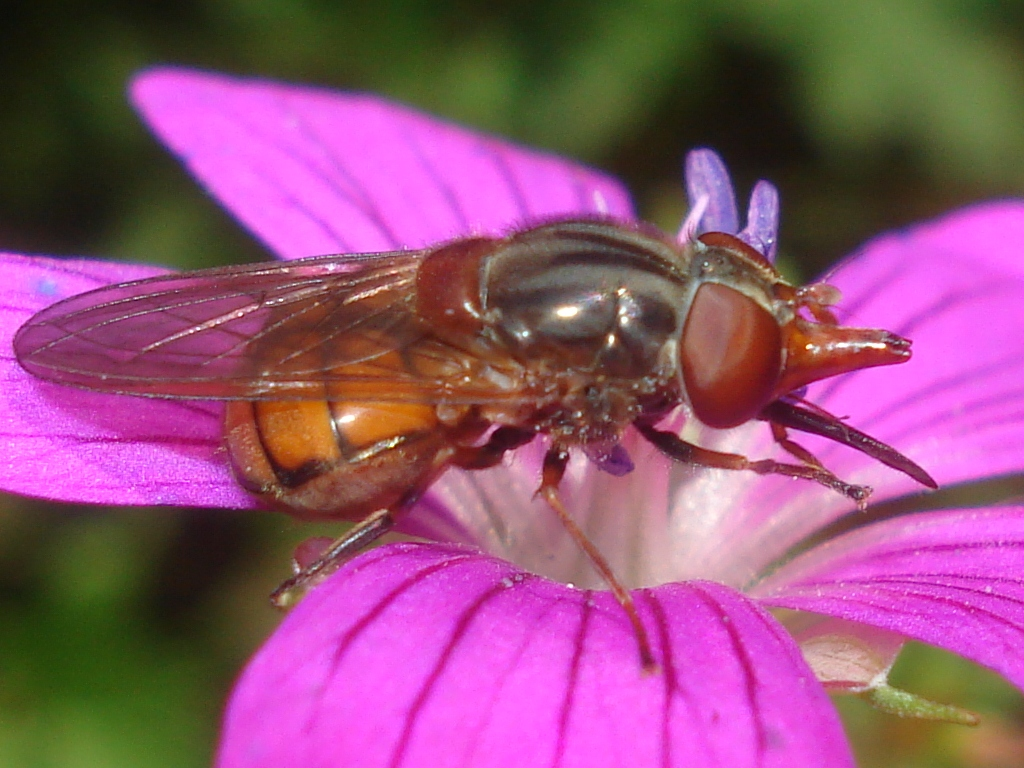
- female

Scientific classification
- Kingdom: Animalia
- Phylum: Arthropoda
- Class: Insecta
- Order: Diptera
- Family: Syrphidae
- Genus: Rhingia
- Species: R. campestris

Binomial name
- Rhingia campestris Meigen, 1822

Synonyms
- Musca macrocephala Harris, 1780; Musca nasata Harris, 1780; Musca nosata Harris, 1780; Rhingia macrocephala (Harris, 1780); Rhingia nasata (Harris, 1780); Rhingia nosata (Harris, 1780)

= Rhingia campestris =

Species of fly

Rhingia campestris is a species of hoverfly, 7–11 millimetres (0.3–0.4 in) long, with a wingspan of 12–18 mm (0.5–0.7 in). It is common across the Palearctic from March until November. It has a broad orange abdomen with a black line along the sides (the black line is absent along the sides of Rhingia rostrata), and has the distinctive long snout of all Rhingia species. Rhingia campestris is the main pollinator for many plant species and due to its long snout it can forage on tubulous flowers. Larvae are associated with cow dung. Adults males feed on nectar, while adult females feed on protein rich pollen, reflecting the cost of developing eggs.

== Description ==
External images For terms see Morphology of Diptera
Wing length 5.5–7 mm. Snout straight, longer than the diameter of the eye in side view. Tergites with black hind edge and side margins and often with a black mark in the middle of the tergite. Pre-genital sternite black-haired. Tibiae red. See references for determination

== Distribution ==
Palearctic Fennoscandia South to the Pyrenees, Spain and the Mediterranean basin. Ireland East through Europe into European Russia and the Caucasus then to Siberia, Mongolia and the Russian Far East to the Pacific coast.

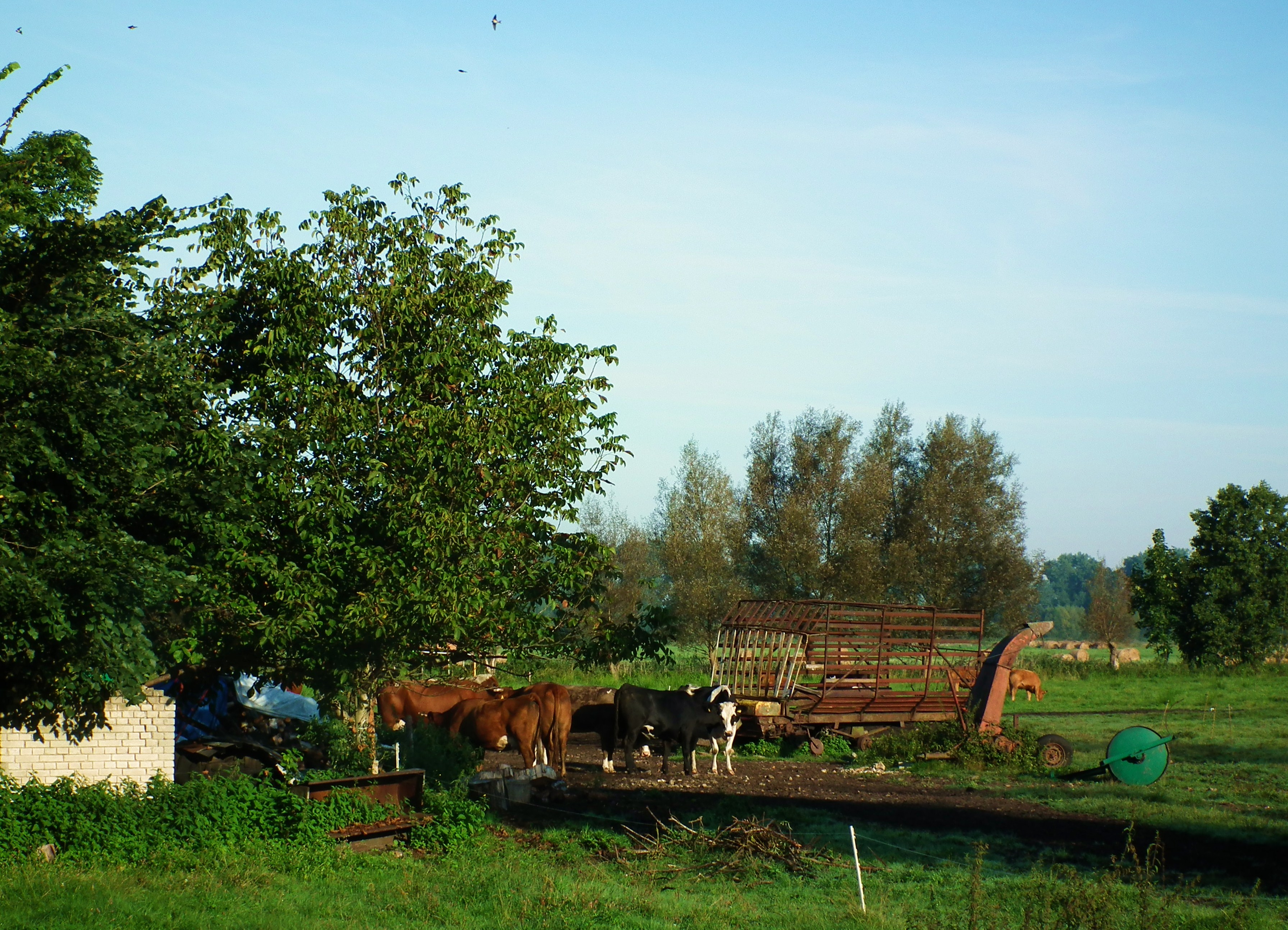
Habitat. Poland. R.campestris is all but absent where cattle are penned.

== Biology ==
Habitat: Wood and wetland occurring most frequently on land where cows are grazed. Can feed at pink flowers which have concealed nectar sources, making them unusable by other flies with less extended mouthparts.
