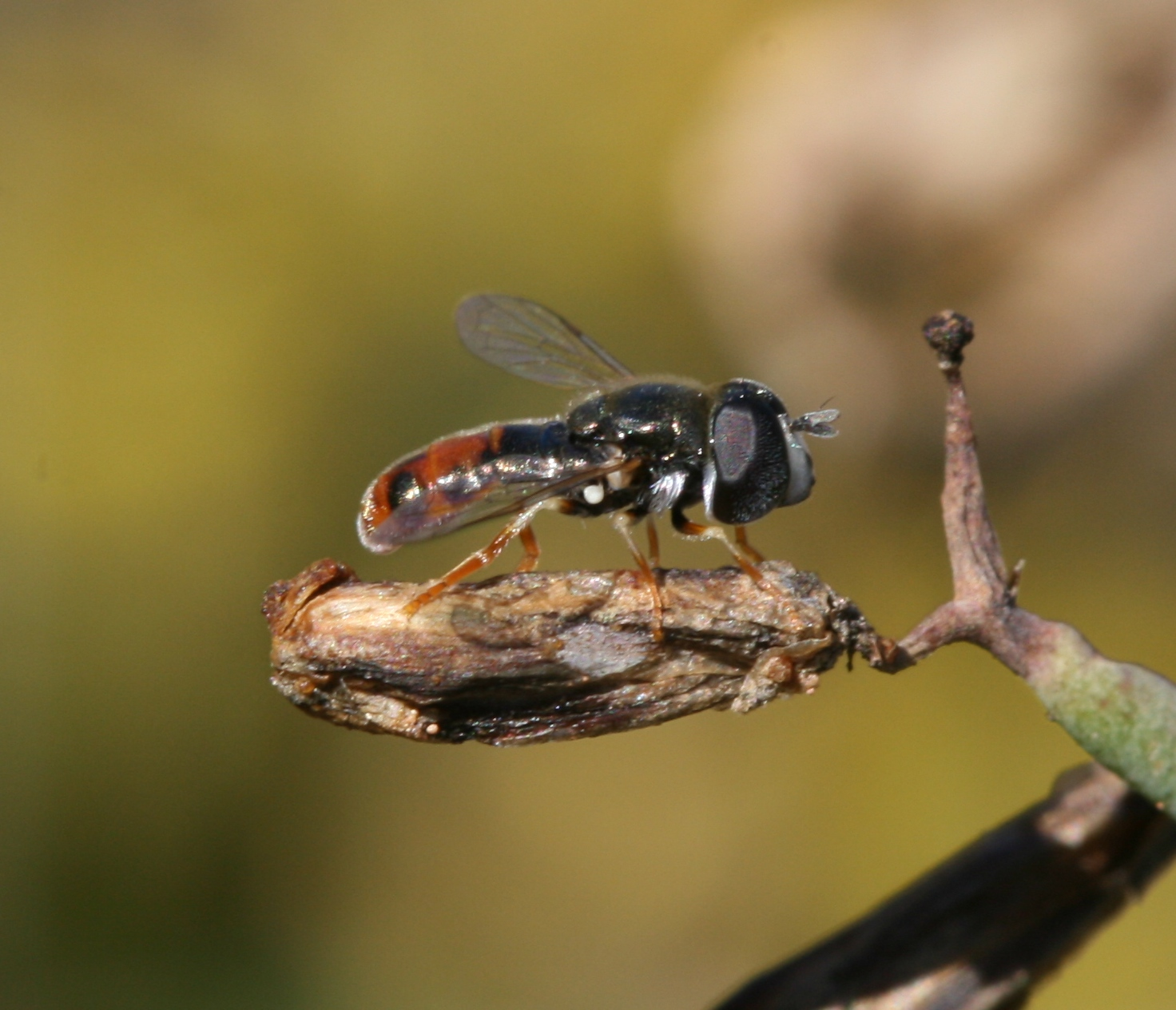
- Paragus tibialis male

Scientific classification
- Kingdom: Animalia
- Phylum: Arthropoda
- Class: Insecta
- Order: Diptera
- Family: Syrphidae
- Genus: Paragus
- Species: P. tibialis

Binomial name
- Paragus tibialis (Fallén, 1817)

Synonyms

= Paragus tibialis =

Species of fly

Paragus tibialis, is a species of hoverfly found in many parts of Europe and North Africa. It has a preference for drier areas and its larvae feed on root aphids.
