= List of Rhamphomyia species =

This is a list of 620 species in Rhamphomyia, a genus of dance flies in the family Empididae.

== Rhamphomyia species ==
- Rhamphomyia acuta Bartak, 2002^{c g}
- Rhamphomyia adversa Coquillett, 1900^{i c g}
- Rhamphomyia aethiops Zetterstedt, 1838^{c g}
- Rhamphomyia agasciles Walker, 1849^{i c g}
- Rhamphomyia alameda Bartak, 2002^{c g}
- Rhamphomyia albata Coquillett, 1902^{i c g}
- Rhamphomyia albibasis Frey, 1935^{c g}
- Rhamphomyia albidipennis Malloch, 1930^{c g}
- Rhamphomyia albidiventris Strobl, 1898^{c g}
- Rhamphomyia albipennis (Fallen, 1816)^{c g}
- Rhamphomyia albissima Frey, 1913^{c g}
- Rhamphomyia albitarsis Collin, 1926^{c g}
- Rhamphomyia albogeniculata Roser, 1840^{c g}
- Rhamphomyia albohirta Collin, 1926^{c g}
- Rhamphomyia albonigra Frey, 1950^{c g}
- Rhamphomyia albopilosa Coquillett, 1900^{i c g}
- Rhamphomyia albosegmentata Zetterstedt, 1838^{c g}
- Rhamphomyia alpina (Zetterstedt, 1838)^{c g}
- Rhamphomyia alpiniformis Frey, 1950^{c g}
- Rhamphomyia ambocnema Chillcott, 1959^{i c g}
- Rhamphomyia americana Wiedemann, 1830^{i c g}
- Rhamphomyia amoena Loew, 1840^{c g}
- Rhamphomyia ampla Frey, 1952^{c g}
- Rhamphomyia amplicella Coquillett, 1895^{i c g}
- Rhamphomyia amplipedis Coquillett, 1895^{i c g}
- Rhamphomyia andalusiaca Strobl, 1899^{c g}
- Rhamphomyia anfractuosa Bezzi, 1904^{c g}
- Rhamphomyia angulifera Frey, 1913^{c g}
- Rhamphomyia angustifacies Saigusa, 1964^{c g}
- Rhamphomyia angustipennis Loew, 1861^{i c g}
- Rhamphomyia anomala Oldenberg, 1915^{c g}
- Rhamphomyia anomalina Zetterstedt, 1838^{c g}
- Rhamphomyia anomalipennis Meigen, 1822^{c g}
- Rhamphomyia antennata Frey, 1915^{c g}
- Rhamphomyia anthracina Meigen, 1822^{c g}
- Rhamphomyia anthracinella Strobl, 1898^{c g}
- Rhamphomyia anthracodes Coquillett, 1900^{i c g}
- Rhamphomyia aperta Loew^{i c g}
- Rhamphomyia appendens Bartak, 2002^{c g}
- Rhamphomyia appendiculata Macquart, 1827^{c g}
- Rhamphomyia aprilis White, 1916^{c g}
- Rhamphomyia aquaria Bartak, 2002^{c g}
- Rhamphomyia arakawae Matsumura, 1915^{c g}
- Rhamphomyia araneipes Frey, 1951^{c g}
- Rhamphomyia arctotibia Chillcott, 1959^{i c g}
- Rhamphomyia arcuata Coquillett, 1895^{i c g}
- Rhamphomyia argentata Roder, 1887^{c g}
- Rhamphomyia argyrina Bezzi, 1909^{c g}
- Rhamphomyia argyrosoma Saigusa, 1963^{c g}
- Rhamphomyia ariiorum Saigusa, 1964^{c g}
- Rhamphomyia armata Becker, 1915^{c g}
- Rhamphomyia armimana Oldenberg, 1910^{c g}
- Rhamphomyia armipes Sack, 1923^{c g}
- Rhamphomyia arnaudorum Bartak, 2002^{c g}
- Rhamphomyia articularis Bartak, 2002^{c g}
- Rhamphomyia astragala Bartak, 2002^{c g}
- Rhamphomyia aterrima Frey, 1922^{c g}
- Rhamphomyia atra Meigen, 1822^{c g}
- Rhamphomyia atrata Coquillett, 1900^{i c g}
- Rhamphomyia aucta Oldenberg, 1917^{c g}
- Rhamphomyia auricoma Bartak, 2002^{c g}
- Rhamphomyia auripilosa Saigusa, 1964^{c g}
- Rhamphomyia australis Frey, 1922^{c g}
- Rhamphomyia aversa Frey, 1950^{c g}
- Rhamphomyia azauensis Bartak, 1983^{c g}
- Rhamphomyia baicalensis Frey, 1950^{c g}
- Rhamphomyia barbata (Macquart, 1823)^{c g}
- Rhamphomyia barbipalpis Frey, 1950^{c g}
- Rhamphomyia barypoda Coquillett, 1900^{i c g}
- Rhamphomyia basalis Loew, 1864^{i c g}
- Rhamphomyia basisetosa Saigusa, 1966^{c g}
- Rhamphomyia basispinosa Frey, 1950^{c g}
- Rhamphomyia batylimensis Frey, 1922^{c g}
- Rhamphomyia beckeriella Chvala, 1985^{c g}
- Rhamphomyia bellinosetosa Bartak, 2007^{c g}
- Rhamphomyia bergrothi (Kieffer, 1923)^{c g}
- Rhamphomyia bernhardi Bartak, 2000^{c g}
- Rhamphomyia bicalaris Ito & Saigusa, 1967^{c g}
- Rhamphomyia bicolor Macquart, 1827^{c g}
- Rhamphomyia bicoloripes Frey, 1950^{c g}
- Rhamphomyia bifasciata (Rossi, 1794)^{c g}
- Rhamphomyia bifilata Coquillett, 1895^{i c g}
- Rhamphomyia bigelowi Walley, 1927^{i c g}
- Rhamphomyia bilineata (Meigen, 1804)^{c g}
- Rhamphomyia bipila Strobl, 1909^{c g}
- Rhamphomyia birdi Curran, 1929^{i c g}
- Rhamphomyia biroi Bezzi, 1908^{c g}
- Rhamphomyia biserialis (Collin, 1960)^{c g}
- Rhamphomyia bistriata Strobl, 1910^{c g}
- Rhamphomyia boliviana Bezzi, 1905^{c g}
- Rhamphomyia borealis (Fabricius, 1780)^{i c g}
- Rhamphomyia boreoitalica Bartak, 2006^{c g}
- Rhamphomyia brevicellula Saigusa, 1964^{c g}
- Rhamphomyia brevipila Oldenberg, 1922^{c g}
- Rhamphomyia brevis Loew, 1861^{i c g b}
- Rhamphomyia brevistylata Oldenberg, 1927^{c g}
- Rhamphomyia breviventris Frey, 1913^{c g}
- Rhamphomyia brunneostriata Frey, 1950^{c g}
- Rhamphomyia brussnewi Frey, 1915^{c g}
- Rhamphomyia bryanti Bartak, 2002^{c g}
- Rhamphomyia caeca Collin, 1933^{c g}
- Rhamphomyia caesia Meigen, 1822^{c g}
- Rhamphomyia calcarifera Saigusa, 1964^{c g}
- Rhamphomyia californica Coquillett, 1895^{i c g}
- Rhamphomyia caliginosa Collin, 1926^{c g}
- Rhamphomyia calimenda Bartak, 2002^{c g}
- Rhamphomyia calvimontis Cockerell, 1916^{i c g}
- Rhamphomyia cana Zetterstedt, 1849^{c g}
- Rhamphomyia candicans Loew, 1864^{i c g}
- Rhamphomyia candidula Collin, 1933^{c g}
- Rhamphomyia canella Bartak, 2002^{c g}
- Rhamphomyia carbonaria Wiedemann, 1822^{c g}
- Rhamphomyia carenifera Bezzi, 1909^{c g}
- Rhamphomyia carrerai Smith, 1962^{c g}
- Rhamphomyia catarinae Smith, 1962^{c g}
- Rhamphomyia caucasica Frey, 1953^{c g}
- Rhamphomyia caudata Zetterstedt, 1838^{c g}
- Rhamphomyia cavicornuta Bartak, 2002^{c g}
- Rhamphomyia cervi Bartak, 2006^{c g}
- Rhamphomyia chibinensis Frey, 1922^{c g}
- Rhamphomyia chimganensis Bartak, 2000^{c g}
- Rhamphomyia chinoptera Bezzi, 1904^{c g}
- Rhamphomyia chionoptera Bezzi, 1904^{g}
- Rhamphomyia chrysodactyla Frey, 1950^{c g}
- Rhamphomyia chvalai Bartak, 2000^{c g}
- Rhamphomyia ciliata Coquillett, 1895^{i c g}
- Rhamphomyia ciliatopoda Saigusa, 1963^{c g}
- Rhamphomyia cilipes (Say, 1823)^{i c g}
- Rhamphomyia cimrmani Bartak, 2006^{c g}
- Rhamphomyia cinefacta Coquillett, 1900^{i c g}
- Rhamphomyia cineracea Coquillett, 1900^{i c g}
- Rhamphomyia cinerascens (Meigen, 1804)^{c g}
- Rhamphomyia cinerea (Fabricius, 1775)^{c g}
- Rhamphomyia claripennis Oldenberg, 1922^{c g}
- Rhamphomyia clariventris Okada, 1941^{c g}
- Rhamphomyia clauda Coquillett, 1901^{i c g}
- Rhamphomyia clavator Coquillett, 1901^{i c g}
- Rhamphomyia clavigera Loew, 1861^{i c g}
- Rhamphomyia clypeata Macquart, 1834^{c g}
- Rhamphomyia collini Smith, 1971^{c g}
- Rhamphomyia colorata Coquillett, 1895^{i c g}
- Rhamphomyia comosa Bartak, 2002^{c g}
- Rhamphomyia complicans Frey, 1953^{c g}
- Rhamphomyia compta Coquillett, 1895^{i c g}
- Rhamphomyia confinis Zetterstedt, 1852^{c g}
- Rhamphomyia conjuncta Loew, 1861^{i c g}
- Rhamphomyia contracta Bartak, 2002^{c g}
- Rhamphomyia cophas Walker, 1849^{i c g}
- Rhamphomyia coracina Zetterstedt, 1849^{c g}
- Rhamphomyia corvina Loew, 1861^{c g}
- Rhamphomyia crassicauda Strobl, 1893^{c g}
- Rhamphomyia crassimana Strobl, 1898^{c g}
- Rhamphomyia crassirostris (Fallen, 1816)^{c g}
- Rhamphomyia cribata Oldenberg, 1927^{c g}
- Rhamphomyia cribrata Oldenberg, 1927^{g}
- Rhamphomyia crinita Becker, 1887^{c g}
- Rhamphomyia culicina (Fallen, 1816)^{c g}
- Rhamphomyia cummingi Bartak, 2002^{c g}
- Rhamphomyia curicauda Frey, 1949^{g}
- Rhamphomyia currani Steyskal, 1964^{i c g}
- Rhamphomyia curvicauda Frey, 1949^{c g}
- Rhamphomyia curvinervis Oldenberg, 1915^{c g}
- Rhamphomyia curvipes Coquillett, 1904^{i c g}
- Rhamphomyia curvitibia Saigusa, 1965^{c g}
- Rhamphomyia curvula Frey, 1913^{c g}
- Rhamphomyia cyanogaster Wheeler & Melander, 1901^{c g}
- Rhamphomyia cymbella Frey, 1950^{c g}
- Rhamphomyia czizeki Bartak, 1982^{c g}
- Rhamphomyia dalmatica Oldenberg, 1927^{c g}
- Rhamphomyia dana Walker, 1849^{i c g}
- Rhamphomyia daria Walker, 1849^{i c g}
- Rhamphomyia dasycnema Bartak, 2002^{c g}
- Rhamphomyia dasypoda Steyskal, 1964^{i c g}
- Rhamphomyia debilis Loew, 1861^{i c g}
- Rhamphomyia deformata Frey, 1950^{c g}
- Rhamphomyia deformatella Bartak, 2000^{c g}
- Rhamphomyia deformicauda Saigusa, 1964^{c g}
- Rhamphomyia deformipes Saigusa, 1963^{c g}
- Rhamphomyia dentata Oldenberg, 1910^{c g}
- Rhamphomyia dimidiata Loew, 1861^{i c g}
- Rhamphomyia discoidalis Becker, 1889^{c g}
- Rhamphomyia disconcerta Curran, 1930^{i c g}
- Rhamphomyia disconnecta Bartak, 2002^{c g}
- Rhamphomyia disparilis Coquillett, 1900^{i c g}
- Rhamphomyia distincta Frey, 1950^{c g}
- Rhamphomyia diversa Coquillett, 1901^{i c g}
- Rhamphomyia diversipennis Becker, 1900^{c g}
- Rhamphomyia dombai Bartak, 1983^{c g}
- Rhamphomyia dorsata Becker, 1915^{c g}
- Rhamphomyia drahomirae Bartak, 1983^{c g}
- Rhamphomyia dudai Oldenberg, 1927^{c g}
- Rhamphomyia duplicis Coquillett, 1895^{i c g}
- Rhamphomyia ecetra Walker, 1849^{i c g}
- Rhamphomyia effera Coquillett, 1895^{i c g}
- Rhamphomyia eminens Collin, 1933^{c g}
- Rhamphomyia empidiformis Becker, 1909^{c g}
- Rhamphomyia enupta Bartak, 2002^{c g}
- Rhamphomyia erecta Bartak, 1998^{c g}
- Rhamphomyia erinacioides Malloch, 1919^{i c g}
- Rhamphomyia erythrohptalma Meigen, 1830^{g}
- Rhamphomyia erythrophthalma Meigen, 1830^{c g}
- Rhamphomyia eupterota Loew, 1873^{c g}
- Rhamphomyia exigua Loew, 1862^{i c g}
- Rhamphomyia facipennis Zetterstedt, 1838^{c g}
- Rhamphomyia falcipedia Chillcott, 1959^{i c g}
- Rhamphomyia fascipennis Zetterstedt, 1838^{g}
- Rhamphomyia filicauda Henriksen and Lundbeck, 1917^{i c g}
- Rhamphomyia filicaudula Frey, 1950^{c g}
- Rhamphomyia filipjefi Frey, 1950^{c g}
- Rhamphomyia fimbriata Coquillett, 1895^{i c g}
- Rhamphomyia fixus (Harris, 1776)^{c g}
- Rhamphomyia flava (Fallen, 1816)^{c g}
- Rhamphomyia flavipes Matsumura, 1911^{c g}
- Rhamphomyia flavirostris Walker, 1849^{i c g}
- Rhamphomyia flaviventris Macquart, 1827^{c g}
- Rhamphomyia flavobasalis Frey, 1951^{c g}
- Rhamphomyia flexuosa Coquillett, 1895^{i c g}
- Rhamphomyia formidabilis Frey, 1951^{c g}
- Rhamphomyia formosula Melander, 1965^{i c g}
- Rhamphomyia fortis Bartak, 2002^{c g}
- Rhamphomyia foveata Frey, 1950^{c g}
- Rhamphomyia freyi Bartak, 1985^{c g}
- Rhamphomyia fridolini Frey, 1950^{c g}
- Rhamphomyia frontalis Loew, 1862^{i c g}
- Rhamphomyia fulvirostris Saigusa, 1963^{c g}
- Rhamphomyia fulvolanata Frey, 1922^{c g}
- Rhamphomyia fumosa Loew, 1861^{i c g}
- Rhamphomyia furcifer Wheeler & Melander, 1901^{c g}
- Rhamphomyia fuscapicis Saigusa, 1964^{c g}
- Rhamphomyia fuscipennis Zetterstedt, 1838^{c g}
- Rhamphomyia fuscula Zetterstedt, 1838^{c g}
- Rhamphomyia galactodes Bezzi, 1909^{c g}
- Rhamphomyia galactoptera Strobl, 1893^{c g}
- Rhamphomyia galbanata Collin, 1933^{c g}
- Rhamphomyia geisha Frey, 1952^{c g}
- Rhamphomyia geniculata Meigen, 1830^{c g}
- Rhamphomyia gibba (Fallen, 1816)^{c g}
- Rhamphomyia gibbifera Strobl, 1906^{c g}
- Rhamphomyia gilvipes Loew, 1861^{i c g}
- Rhamphomyia gilvipilosa Coquillett, 1895^{i c g}
- Rhamphomyia glabra Loew, 1861^{i c g}
- Rhamphomyia glauca Coquillett, 1900^{i c g}
- Rhamphomyia gracilis Walker, 1849^{b}
- Rhamphomyia gracilitarsis Frey, 1950^{c g}
- Rhamphomyia grammoptera Frey, 1922^{c g}
- Rhamphomyia granadensis Chvala, 1981^{c g}
- Rhamphomyia gripha Frey, 1935^{c g}
- Rhamphomyia griseola Zetterstedt, 1838^{c g}
- Rhamphomyia griseonigra Brunetti, 1913^{c g}
- Rhamphomyia gufitar Frey, 1922^{c g}
- Rhamphomyia hagoromo Saigusa, 1963^{c g}
- Rhamphomyia hambergi Frey, 1916^{c g}
- Rhamphomyia harpago Frey, 1952^{c g}
- Rhamphomyia helleni Frey, 1922^{c g}
- Rhamphomyia hercynica Oldenberg, 1927^{c g}
- Rhamphomyia herschelli Malloch, 1919^{i c g}
- Rhamphomyia heterochroma Bezzi, 1898^{c g}
- Rhamphomyia heterogyna Frey, 1952^{c g}
- Rhamphomyia hilariformis Frey, 1922^{c g}
- Rhamphomyia himalayana Brunetti, 1913^{c g}
- Rhamphomyia hirsutipes Collin, 1926^{c g}
- Rhamphomyia hirticula Collin, 1937^{i c g}
- Rhamphomyia hirtimana Oldenberg, 1922^{c g}
- Rhamphomyia hirtipes Loew, 1864^{i c g}
- Rhamphomyia hirtula Zetterstedt, 1842^{i c g}
- Rhamphomyia hoeli Frey, 1950^{i c g}
- Rhamphomyia horitropha Bartak, 2002^{c g}
- Rhamphomyia hovgaardii Holmgren, 1880^{i c g}
- Rhamphomyia hungarica (Weber, 1969)^{c g}
- Rhamphomyia hyalina Brullé, 1833^{c g}
- Rhamphomyia hybotina Zetterstedt, 1838^{c g}
- Rhamphomyia idei Saigusa, 1963^{c g}
- Rhamphomyia idonea Bartak, 2002^{c g}
- Rhamphomyia ignobilis Zetterstedt, 1859^{c g}
- Rhamphomyia impedita Loew, 1862^{i c g}
- Rhamphomyia improbula Frey, 1953^{c g}
- Rhamphomyia incompleta Loew, 1863^{i c g}
- Rhamphomyia insecta Coquillett, 1895^{i c g}
- Rhamphomyia insignis Loew, 1871^{c g}
- Rhamphomyia intercedens Frey, 1950^{c g}
- Rhamphomyia interserta Collin, 1933^{c g}
- Rhamphomyia intersita Collin, 1960^{c g}
- Rhamphomyia intonsa Steyskal, 1964^{i c g}
- Rhamphomyia inyoca Bartak, 2002^{c g}
- Rhamphomyia ise Frey, 1953^{c g}
- Rhamphomyia issikii Ito, 1961^{c g}
- Rhamphomyia itoi Frey, 1950^{c g}
- Rhamphomyia janoensis Bartak, 1981^{c g}
- Rhamphomyia janovensis Bartak, 1981^{c g}
- Rhamphomyia japonica Frey, 1950^{c g}
- Rhamphomyia jaroslavi Bartak, 2002^{c g}
- Rhamphomyia jesonensis Matsumura, 1915^{c g}
- Rhamphomyia jubata Chillcott, 1959^{i c g}
- Rhamphomyia kamenuschka Bartak, 2003^{c g}
- Rhamphomyia kamtschatica Frey, 1922^{c g}
- Rhamphomyia kaninensis Frey, 1913^{c g}
- Rhamphomyia karamanensis Bartak, Ciftci & Hasbenli, 2007^{c g}
- Rhamphomyia kashiiensis Saigusa, 1964^{c g}
- Rhamphomyia kerteszi Oldenberg, 1927^{c g}
- Rhamphomyia kjellmanii Holmgren, 1880^{c g}
- Rhamphomyia klapperichi Frey, 1953^{c g}
- Rhamphomyia knutsoni Bartak, 2002^{c g}
- Rhamphomyia koreana Bartak, 1997^{c g}
- Rhamphomyia kovalevi Bartak, 2004^{c g}
- Rhamphomyia kozaneki Bartak, 1997^{c g}
- Rhamphomyia kreischi Bartak, 1998^{c g}
- Rhamphomyia kubiki Bartak, 2002^{c g}
- Rhamphomyia ladas Frey, 1955^{c g}
- Rhamphomyia laevigata Loew, 1861^{i c g}
- Rhamphomyia laevipes (Fallen, 1816)^{c g}
- Rhamphomyia lamellata Collin, 1926^{c g}
- Rhamphomyia lamelliseta Ringdahl, 1928^{c g}
- Rhamphomyia lammifera Saigusa, 1963^{c g}
- Rhamphomyia lamniferella Saigusa, 1964^{c g}
- Rhamphomyia lapponica Frey, 1955^{c g}
- Rhamphomyia latifrons Frey, 1913^{c g}
- Rhamphomyia latilobata Bartak, 2002^{c g}
- Rhamphomyia latiscaura Bartak, 2002^{c g}
- Rhamphomyia latistriata Frey, 1953^{c g}
- Rhamphomyia lautereri Bartak, 1981^{c g}
- Rhamphomyia leptidiformis Frey, 1950^{c g}
- Rhamphomyia leptopus Loew, 1873^{c g}
- Rhamphomyia leucophenga Bezzi, 1905^{c g}
- Rhamphomyia leucoptera Loew, 1861^{i c g}
- Rhamphomyia leucopterella Saigusa, 1964^{c g}
- Rhamphomyia limata Coquillett, 1900^{i c g}
- Rhamphomyia limbata Loew, 1861^{i c g}
- Rhamphomyia lindneri Bartak, 1998^{c g}
- Rhamphomyia litoralis Saigusa, 1994^{c g}
- Rhamphomyia lividiventris Zetterstedt, 1838^{c g}
- Rhamphomyia loewi Nowicki, 1868^{c g}
- Rhamphomyia longefilata Strobl, 1906^{c g}
- Rhamphomyia longicauda Loew, 1861^{i c g b} (long-tailed dance fly)
- Rhamphomyia longicornis Loew, 1861^{i c g}
- Rhamphomyia longidiscalis Bartak, 2002^{c g}
- Rhamphomyia longipennis Loew, 1861^{i c g}
- Rhamphomyia longipes (Meigen, 1804)^{c g}
- Rhamphomyia longirostris (Lindner, 1972)^{c g}
- Rhamphomyia longiseta Saigusa, 1964^{c g}
- Rhamphomyia longistigma Frey, 1953^{c g}
- Rhamphomyia loripedis Coquillett, 1895^{i c g}
- Rhamphomyia lucidula Zetterstedt, 1842^{c g}
- Rhamphomyia luctifera Loew, 1861^{i c g}
- Rhamphomyia luctuosa Loew, 1872^{i g}
- Rhamphomyia luridipennis Nowicki, 1868^{c g}
- Rhamphomyia luteicoxa Frey, 1953^{c g}
- Rhamphomyia luteiventer Curran, 1929^{i g}
- Rhamphomyia luteiventris Loew, 1864^{i c g}
- Rhamphomyia maai Saigusa, 1966^{c g}
- Rhamphomyia macilenta Loew, 1864^{i c g}
- Rhamphomyia macrura Loew, 1871^{c g}
- Rhamphomyia maculipennis Zetterstedt, 1842^{c g}
- Rhamphomyia magellensis Frey, 1922^{c g}
- Rhamphomyia malaisei Frey, 1935^{c g}
- Rhamphomyia mallos Walker, 1849^{i c g}
- Rhamphomyia manca Coquillett, 1895^{i c g}
- Rhamphomyia marginata (Fabricius, 1787)^{c g}
- Rhamphomyia mariobezzii Bartak, 2001^{c g}
- Rhamphomyia maroccana Collin, 1953^{c g}
- Rhamphomyia melania Becker, 1887^{c g}
- Rhamphomyia mendicula Frey, 1950^{c g}
- Rhamphomyia merzi Bartak, 2000^{c g}
- Rhamphomyia micans Oldenberg, 1915^{c g}
- Rhamphomyia micrargyra Bezzi, 1909^{c g}
- Rhamphomyia micropyga Collin, 1926^{c g}
- Rhamphomyia minor Oldenberg, 1922^{c g}
- Rhamphomyia minutiforceps Bartak & Kubik, 2008^{c g}
- Rhamphomyia minutiforcipella Bartak & Kubik, 2008^{c g}
- Rhamphomyia minutissima Saigusa, 1964^{c g}
- Rhamphomyia minytus Walker, 1849^{i c g}
- Rhamphomyia mirabilis Saigusa, 1963^{c g}
- Rhamphomyia mirifica Frey, 1922^{c g}
- Rhamphomyia modesta Wahlberg, 1844^{c g}
- Rhamphomyia mollipes Frey, 1953^{c g}
- Rhamphomyia mollis Collin, 1933^{c g}
- Rhamphomyia monacha Bartak, 2002^{c g}
- Rhamphomyia monstrosa Bezzi, 1909^{c g}
- Rhamphomyia montana Oldenberg, 1915^{c g}
- Rhamphomyia morenae Strobl, 1899^{c g}
- Rhamphomyia morio Zetterstedt, 1838^{c g}
- Rhamphomyia multicolor Frey, 1952^{c g}
- Rhamphomyia multisinuosa Frey, 1950^{c g}
- Rhamphomyia murina Collin, 1926^{c g}
- Rhamphomyia mutabilis Loew, 1862^{i c g}
- Rhamphomyia naias Bartak, 2002^{c g}
- Rhamphomyia nakasujii Saigusa, 1963^{c g}
- Rhamphomyia nana Loew, 1861^{i c g b}
- Rhamphomyia nasoni Coquillett, 1895^{i c g b}
- Rhamphomyia nevadensis Lindner, 1962^{c g}
- Rhamphomyia nigraccipitrina Ito & Saigusa, 1967^{c g}
- Rhamphomyia nigricans Loew, 1864^{i c g}
- Rhamphomyia nigricauda Becker, 1907^{c g}
- Rhamphomyia nigrifemina Saigusa, 1964^{c g}
- Rhamphomyia nigripennis (Fabricius, 1794)^{c g}
- Rhamphomyia nigripes Strobl, 1898^{c g}
- Rhamphomyia nigrita Zetterstedt, 1838^{i c g}
- Rhamphomyia nigromaculata Roser, 1840^{c g}
- Rhamphomyia nipponalpina Saigusa, 1964^{c g}
- Rhamphomyia nipponensis Frey, 1951^{c g}
- Rhamphomyia nitida Macquart, 1827^{c g}
- Rhamphomyia nitidifrons Ito & Saigusa, 1967^{c g}
- Rhamphomyia nitidistriata Saigusa, 1964^{c g}
- Rhamphomyia nitidivittata Macquart, 1846^{i c g}
- Rhamphomyia nitidolineata Frey, 1913^{c g}
- Rhamphomyia nitidula Zetterstedt, 1842^{c g}
- Rhamphomyia niveipennis Zetterstedt, 1838^{c g}
- Rhamphomyia nodipes Fallen, 1816^{c g}
- Rhamphomyia nordqvisti Holmgren, 1880^{c g}
- Rhamphomyia novecarolina Beutenmuller, 1913^{i c g}
- Rhamphomyia nox Oldenberg, 1917^{c g}
- Rhamphomyia nubes (Collin, 1969)^{c g}
- Rhamphomyia nubigena Bezzi, 1904^{c g}
- Rhamphomyia nudipes Oldenberg, 1927^{c g}
- Rhamphomyia obscura Zetterstedt, 1838^{c g}
- Rhamphomyia obscurella Zetterstedt, 1842^{c g}
- Rhamphomyia obscuripennis Meigen, 1830^{c g}
- Rhamphomyia oedimana Bartak, 2002^{c g}
- Rhamphomyia olympiana Bartak, 1999^{c g}
- Rhamphomyia omissinervis Becker, 1900^{c g}
- Rhamphomyia omogoensis Saigusa, 1964^{c g}
- Rhamphomyia opacithorax Malloch, 1923^{i c g}
- Rhamphomyia optimalis Frey, 1953^{c g}
- Rhamphomyia ornithorhampha Frey, 1950^{c g}
- Rhamphomyia otiosa Coquillett, 1895^{i c g}
- Rhamphomyia ozernajensis Frey, 1922^{c g}
- Rhamphomyia ozerovi Bartak, 2003^{c g}
- Rhamphomyia pachymera Bigot, 1887^{i c g}
- Rhamphomyia pachymeriae Bartak & Kubik, 2009^{c g}
- Rhamphomyia pallistigma Roser, 1840^{c g}
- Rhamphomyia palmeni Frey, 1913^{c g}
- Rhamphomyia paradoxa Wahlberg, 1844^{c g}
- Rhamphomyia paragramma Bartak, 2002^{c g}
- Rhamphomyia paraleucoptera Frey, 1950^{c g}
- Rhamphomyia parva Coquillett, 1895^{i c g}
- Rhamphomyia parvicellulata Frey, 1922^{g}
- Rhamphomyia parvicellutata Frey, 1922^{c g}
- Rhamphomyia parvisinuata Bartak, 2002^{c g}
- Rhamphomyia parvula Frey, 1955^{c g}
- Rhamphomyia pectinata Loew, 1861^{i c g}
- Rhamphomyia pectoris Coquillett, 1895^{i c g}
- Rhamphomyia pendella Bartak, 2002^{c g}
- Rhamphomyia pendens Bartak, 2002^{c g}
- Rhamphomyia penicillata Bezzi, 1909^{c g}
- Rhamphomyia phemius Walker, 1849^{i c g}
- Rhamphomyia physoprocta Frey, 1913^{c g}
- Rhamphomyia piedmontensis Bartak, 2007^{c g}
- Rhamphomyia pilifer Meigen, 1838^{c g}
- Rhamphomyia piligeronis Coquillett, 1895^{i c g}
- Rhamphomyia pilimanicula Saigusa, 1964^{c g}
- Rhamphomyia pilosifacies Saigusa, 1963^{c g}
- Rhamphomyia pilostibia Bartak & Kubik, 2009^{c g}
- Rhamphomyia pkoronyi Bezzi, 1904^{c g}
- Rhamphomyia platycnemis Frey, 1922^{c g}
- Rhamphomyia pleciaeformis Frey, 1950^{c g}
- Rhamphomyia plumifera Zetterstedt, 1838^{c g}
- Rhamphomyia plumipes (Meigen, 1804)^{c g}
- Rhamphomyia poissoni (Trehen, 1966)^{c g}
- Rhamphomyia pokornyi Bezzi, 1904^{g}
- Rhamphomyia polita Loew, 1862^{i c g}
- Rhamphomyia politella Malloch, 1931^{c g}
- Rhamphomyia ponti Bartak, 2007^{c g}
- Rhamphomyia poplitea Wahlberg, 1844^{c g}
- Rhamphomyia porteri Brèthes, 1924^{c g}
- Rhamphomyia powelli Bartak, 2002^{c g}
- Rhamphomyia praecellens Frey, 1952^{c g}
- Rhamphomyia praecipua Bartak, 2002^{c g}
- Rhamphomyia praestans Frey, 1913^{c g}
- Rhamphomyia praeterita Bartak, 2002^{c g}
- Rhamphomyia prava Chillcott, 1959^{i c g}
- Rhamphomyia pretiosa Frey, 1953^{c g}
- Rhamphomyia priapulus Loew, 1861^{i c g}
- Rhamphomyia proclinata Frey, 1950^{c g}
- Rhamphomyia prodroma Bartak, 2002^{c g}
- Rhamphomyia pseudocrinita Strobl, 1909^{c g}
- Rhamphomyia pseudogibba Strobl, 1910^{c g}
- Rhamphomyia psychomorpha Saigusa, 1964^{c g}
- Rhamphomyia pteropyga Frey, 1951^{c g}
- Rhamphomyia pulla Loew, 1861^{i c g}
- Rhamphomyia pusilla Zetterstedt, 1838^{c g}
- Rhamphomyia pusio Loew, 1861^{i c g}
- Rhamphomyia pyctes Bartak, 2002^{c g}
- Rhamphomyia quinquelineata (Say, 1823)^{i c g}
- Rhamphomyia rampazzii Bartak, 2006^{c g}
- Rhamphomyia rava Loew, 1962^{i c g}
- Rhamphomyia ravida Coquillett, 1895^{i c g}
- Rhamphomyia reflexa Zetterstedt, 1838^{c g}
- Rhamphomyia retortus Frey, 1955^{c g}
- Rhamphomyia rhodesiensis Collin, 1938^{c g}
- Rhamphomyia rhytmica Bartak, 2002^{c g}
- Rhamphomyia ringens Bartak, 2002^{c g}
- Rhamphomyia rivalis Bartak, 2002^{c g}
- Rhamphomyia robustior Frey, 1922^{c g}
- Rhamphomyia rogersi Bartak, 2002^{c g}
- Rhamphomyia rostrifera Bezzi, 1912^{c g}
- Rhamphomyia rotundicauda Saigusa, 1964^{c g}
- Rhamphomyia rufipes (Meigen, 1804)^{c g}
- Rhamphomyia rufirostris Say, 1829^{i c g}
- Rhamphomyia rupestris Oldenberg, 1927^{c g}
- Rhamphomyia ryongaksanensis Bartak, 1997^{c g}
- Rhamphomyia saintbaumensis Bartak, 2007^{c g}
- Rhamphomyia samarkandensis Bartak, 2000^{c g}
- Rhamphomyia sanctimauritii Becker, 1887^{c g}
- Rhamphomyia sapporensis Matsumura, 1915^{c g}
- Rhamphomyia sareptana Frey, 1950^{c g}
- Rhamphomyia sauteri Bezzi, 1912^{c g}
- Rhamphomyia scaura Bartak, 2002^{c g}
- Rhamphomyia scaurissima Wheeler, 1896^{i c g}
- Rhamphomyia sciarina (Fallen, 1816)^{c g}
- Rhamphomyia scitula Frey, 1922^{c g}
- Rhamphomyia scolopacea (Say, 1823)^{i c g}
- Rhamphomyia scopifer Bartak, 2002^{c g}
- Rhamphomyia scutellaris Coquillett, 1895^{i c g}
- Rhamphomyia sellacrinita Bartak, 2007^{c g}
- Rhamphomyia sellaensis Bartak, 1999^{c g}
- Rhamphomyia sellata Loew, 1861^{i c g}
- Rhamphomyia semipellucida Frey, 1950^{c g}
- Rhamphomyia seposita Collin, 1933^{c g}
- Rhamphomyia septembris White, 1916^{c g}
- Rhamphomyia serpentata Loew, 1856^{c g}
- Rhamphomyia setitibia Frey, 1950^{c g}
- Rhamphomyia setosa Coquillett, 1895^{i c g}
- Rhamphomyia setulosa Saigusa, 1964^{c g}
- Rhamphomyia shirayuki Saigusa, 1964^{c g}
- Rhamphomyia siebecki Strobl, 1898^{c g}
- Rhamphomyia similata Malloch, 1919^{i c g}
- Rhamphomyia simplex Zetterstedt, 1849^{c g}
- Rhamphomyia slovaki Bartak, 1997^{c g}
- Rhamphomyia soccata Loew, 1861^{i c g}
- Rhamphomyia sociabilis (Williston, 1893)^{i c g}
- Rhamphomyia soleata Melander, 1965^{i c g}
- Rhamphomyia sordida Loew, 1861^{i c g}
- Rhamphomyia sororia Frey, 1953^{c g}
- Rhamphomyia spatenkai Bartak, 2000^{c g}
- Rhamphomyia spectabilis Frey, 1922^{c g}
- Rhamphomyia speighti Bartak, 2006^{c g}
- Rhamphomyia sphaerophora Frey, 1950^{c g}
- Rhamphomyia sphenoptera Loew, 1873^{c g}
- Rhamphomyia spinipes (Fallen, 1816)^{c g}
- Rhamphomyia spiniventris Saigusa, 1964^{c g}
- Rhamphomyia spinosipes Oldenberg, 1915^{c g}
- Rhamphomyia spirifera Frey, 1955^{c g}
- Rhamphomyia stackelbergi Frey, 1950^{c g}
- Rhamphomyia stigmosa Macquart, 1827^{c g}
- Rhamphomyia strobli Bartak, 1985^{c g}
- Rhamphomyia stylata Coquillett, 1895^{i c g}
- Rhamphomyia subacuta Bartak, 2002^{c g}
- Rhamphomyia subcinarescens Collin, 1926^{c g}
- Rhamphomyia subdolomitica Bartak, 1981^{c g}
- Rhamphomyia subglaucella Frey, 1922^{c g}
- Rhamphomyia subpusilla Frey, 1951^{c g}
- Rhamphomyia subsultans Frey, 1922^{c g}
- Rhamphomyia sudigeronis Coquillett, 1895^{i c g b}
- Rhamphomyia sulcata (Meigen, 1804)^{c g}
- Rhamphomyia sulcatella Collin, 1926^{c g}
- Rhamphomyia sulcatina Collin, 1926^{c g}
- Rhamphomyia sutibialis Frey, 1950^{c g}
- Rhamphomyia tachulanensis Saigusa, 1966^{c g}
- Rhamphomyia taenia Ito & Saigusa, 1967^{c g}
- Rhamphomyia taimyrensis Frey, 1950^{c g}
- Rhamphomyia takagii Saigusa, 1963^{c g}
- Rhamphomyia takahashii Saigusa, 1963^{c g}
- Rhamphomyia tarsata Meigen, 1822^{c g}
- Rhamphomyia taylori Smith, 1971^{c g}
- Rhamphomyia teberdana Bartak, 1983^{c g}
- Rhamphomyia tenuipes Becker, 1907^{c g}
- Rhamphomyia tenuiterfilata Becker, 1900^{c g}
- Rhamphomyia tersa Coquillett, 1895^{i c g}
- Rhamphomyia testacea Loew, 1862^{i c g}
- Rhamphomyia thaiciliata Bartak & Kubik, 2008^{c g}
- Rhamphomyia tibialis Meigen, 1822^{c g}
- Rhamphomyia tibiella Zetterstedt, 1842^{c g}
- Rhamphomyia tienshanensis Bartak, 2000^{c g}
- Rhamphomyia tipularia Fallen, 1816^{c g}
- Rhamphomyia tolteca Wheeler & Melander, 1901^{c g}
- Rhamphomyia tonsa Loew, 1871^{c g}
- Rhamphomyia transversipyga Frey, 1950^{c g}
- Rhamphomyia triangulifera Bartak, 2002^{c g}
- Rhamphomyia trichopleura Saigusa, 1964^{c g}
- Rhamphomyia trigemina Oldenberg, 1927^{c g}
- Rhamphomyia trilineata Zetterstedt, 1859^{c g}
- Rhamphomyia trimaculata Saigusa, 1963^{c g}
- Rhamphomyia triseta Saigusa, 1963^{c g}
- Rhamphomyia tristis Walker, 1857^{i c g}
- Rhamphomyia tristriolata Nowicki, 1868^{c g}
- Rhamphomyia truncata Frey, 1922^{c g}
- Rhamphomyia tuberifemur Bartak, 2004^{c g}
- Rhamphomyia tumiditarsis Oldenberg, 1917^{c g}
- Rhamphomyia turneri Bartak, 2002^{c g}
- Rhamphomyia tympanica Bezzi, 1909^{c g}
- Rhamphomyia umbilicata Loew, 1861^{i c g}
- Rhamphomyia umbripennis Meigen, 1822^{c g}
- Rhamphomyia umbripes Becker, 1887^{c g}
- Rhamphomyia umbrosa Loew, 1864^{i c g}
- Rhamphomyia unguiculata Frey, 1913^{c g}
- Rhamphomyia ungulata Loew, 1861^{i g}
- Rhamphomyia unimaculata Loew, 1862^{i c g}
- Rhamphomyia uralensis Becker, 1915^{c g}
- Rhamphomyia ursina Oldenberg, 1915^{c g}
- Rhamphomyia ursinella Melander, 1927^{i c g}
- Rhamphomyia uzbekistanica Bartak, 2000^{c g}
- Rhamphomyia valga Coquillett, 1895^{i c g}
- Rhamphomyia vara Loew, 1861^{i c g}
- Rhamphomyia variabilis (Fallen, 1816)^{c g}
- Rhamphomyia verae Smith, 1962^{c g}
- Rhamphomyia vernalis Saigusa, 1964^{c g}
- Rhamphomyia versicolor Chillcott, 1959^{i c g}
- Rhamphomyia vesiculosa (Fallen, 1816)^{c g}
- Rhamphomyia vicana (Harris, 1780)^{c g}
- Rhamphomyia villipes Coquillett, 1900^{i c g}
- Rhamphomyia villosella Bartak, 2002^{c g}
- Rhamphomyia villosipes Bezzi, 1905^{c g}
- Rhamphomyia virgata Coquillett, 1895^{i c g}
- Rhamphomyia vittata Loew, 1862^{i c g}
- Rhamphomyia vockerothi Bartak, 2002^{c g}
- Rhamphomyia wagneri Bartak, 1998^{c g}
- Rhamphomyia weedii Coquillett^{i c g}
- Rhamphomyia wuroentausi Frey, 1922^{c g}
- Rhamphomyia xanthomera Bartak, 2002^{c g}
- Rhamphomyia yasumatsui Saigusa, 1963^{c g}
- Rhamphomyia zaitsevi Becker, 1915^{c g}

Data sources: i = ITIS, c = Catalogue of Life, g = GBIF, b = Bugguide.net
