= Rhamphomyia sudigeronis =

Scientific classification
- Domain: Eukaryota
- Kingdom: Animalia
- Phylum: Arthropoda
- Class: Insecta
- Order: Diptera
- Family: Empididae
- Genus: Rhamphomyia
- Species: R. sudigeronis

Binomial name
- Rhamphomyia sudigeronis Coquillett, 1895

Species of fly

Rhamphomyia sudigeronis is a species of dance flies (insects in the family Empididae).
