= Rhamphomyia brevis =

Scientific classification
- Domain: Eukaryota
- Kingdom: Animalia
- Phylum: Arthropoda
- Class: Insecta
- Order: Diptera
- Family: Empididae
- Genus: Rhamphomyia
- Species: R. brevis

Binomial name
- Rhamphomyia brevis Loew, 1861

Species of fly

Rhamphomyia brevis is a species of dance flies (insects in the family Empididae).
